= Magnetic resonance imaging of the brain =

MRI of the brain
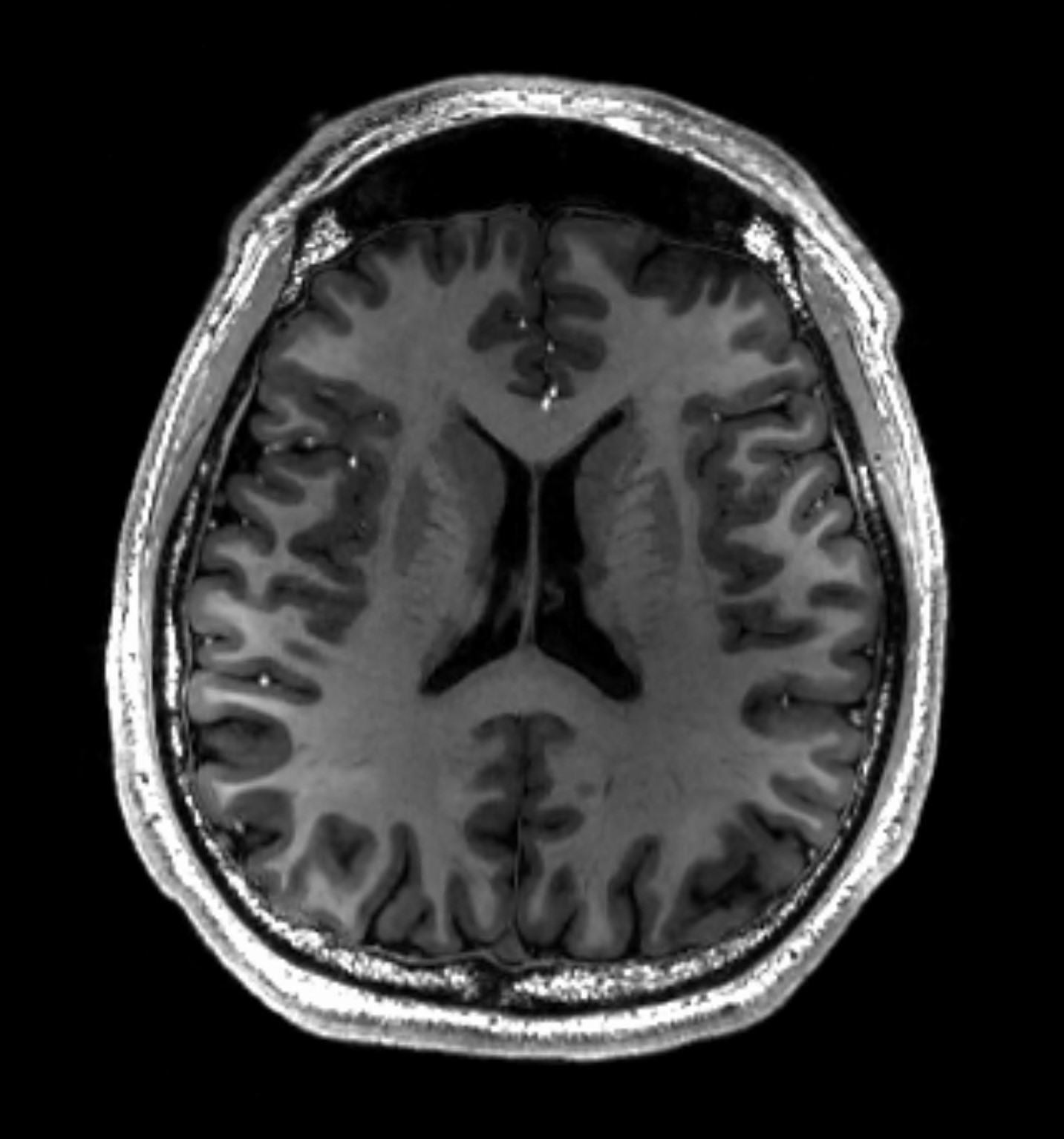
- Cross-sectional T1-weighted MRI of a healthy human brain acquired with an ultra high-field MR of 7 Tesla field strength
- ICD-10-PCS: B030ZZZ
- ICD-9-CM: 88.91
- OPS-301 code: 3-800, 3-820

Magnetic resonance imaging of the brain uses magnetic resonance imaging (MRI) to produce high-quality two- or three-dimensional images of the brain, brainstem, and cerebellum without ionizing radiation (X-rays) or radioactive tracers.

== History ==
The first MR images of a human brain were obtained in 1978 by two groups of researchers at EMI Laboratories led by Ian Robert Young and Hugh Clow. In 1986, Charles L. Dumoulin and Howard R. Hart at General Electric developed MR angiography; Denis Le Bihan obtained his first diffusion images and later patented some aspects of diffusion MRI. In 1988, Arno Villringer and colleagues demonstrated that susceptibility contrast agents may be employed in perfusion MRI. In 1990, Seiji Ogawa at AT&T Bell labs recognized that oxygen-depleted blood with dHb was attracted to a magnetic field, and discovered the technique that underlies Functional Magnetic Resonance Imaging (fMRI).

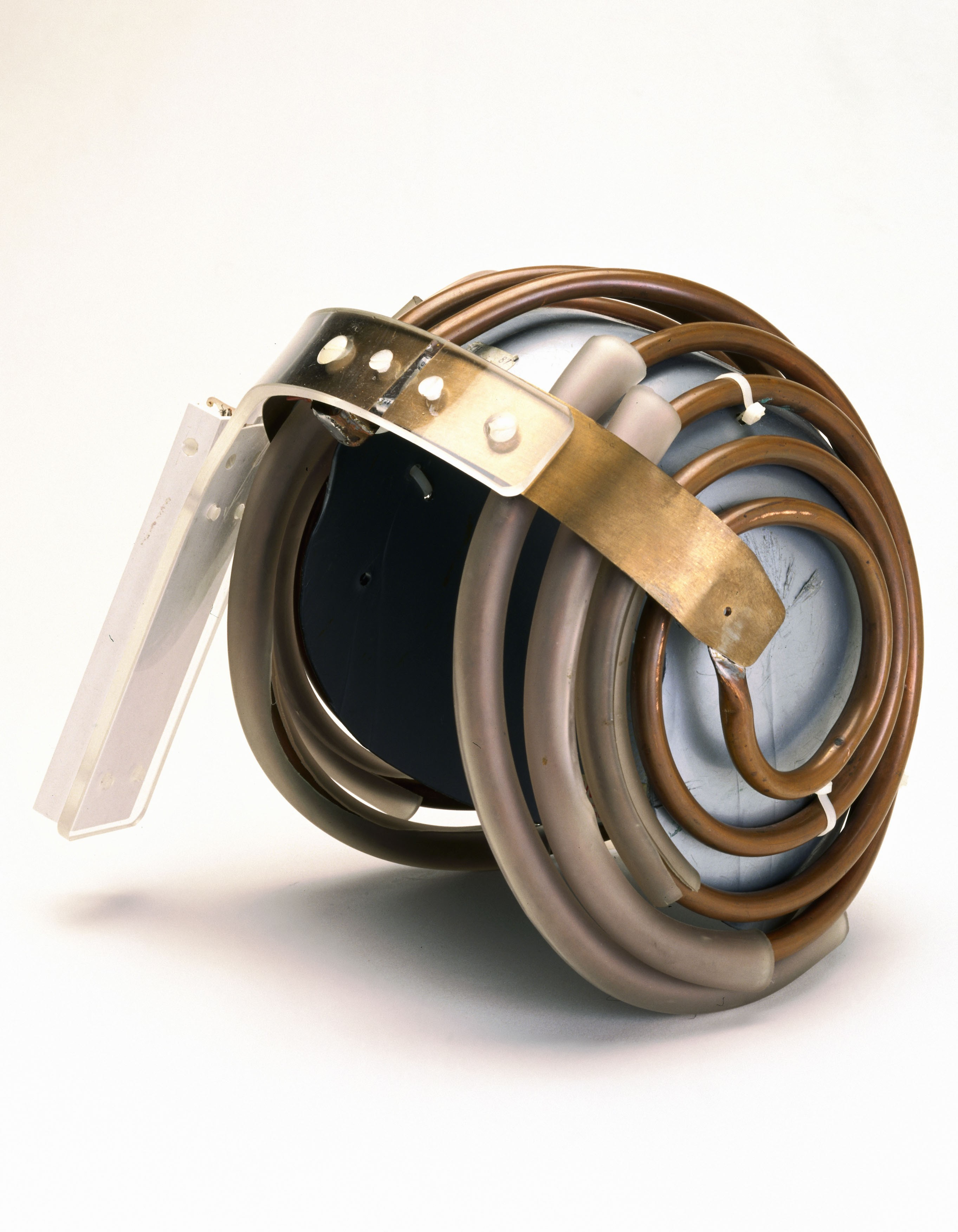
A 'Jedi' helmet, on display at the Science Museum:Medicine:The Wellcome Galleries

In the early 1980s to the early 1990s, 'Jedi' helmets, inspired by the 'Return of the Jedi' Star Wars film, were sometimes worn by children in order to obtain good image quality. The copper coils of the helmet were used as a radio aerial to detect the signals while the 'Jedi' association encouraged children to wear the helmets and not be frightened by the procedure. These helmets were no longer needed as MR scanners improved.

In the early 1990s, Peter Basser and Le Bihan, working at NIH, and Aaron Filler, Franklyn Howe, and colleagues developed diffusion tensor imaging (DTI). The first DTI Brain Tractogram was published by the United States as Figure 17 of US Patent 5,560,360 (filed March 9, 1993, granted Oct. 1, 1996 - Filler, Howe, Richards & Tsuruda). Joseph Hajnal, Young and Graeme Bydder described the use of FLAIR pulse sequence to demonstrate high signal regions in normal white matter in 1992. In the same year, John Detre, Alan P. Koretsky and coworkers developed arterial spin labeling. In 1997, Jürgen R. Reichenbach, E. Mark Haacke and coworkers at Washington University in St. Louis developed Susceptibility weighted imaging.

The first study of the human brain at 3.0 T was published in 1994, and in 1998 at 8 T. Studies of the human brain have been performed at 9.4 T (2006), 10.5 T (2019), and up to 11.7 T (2024).

Paul Lauterbur and Sir Peter Mansfield were awarded the 2003 Nobel Prize in Physiology or Medicine for their discoveries concerning MRI.

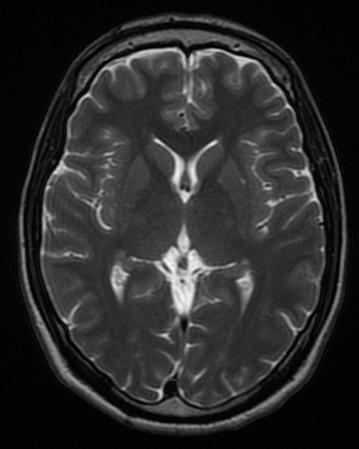
This axial T2-weighted (CSF white) MR scan shows a normal brain at the level of the lateral ventricles.

The record for the highest spatial resolution of a whole intact brain (postmortem) is 100 microns, from Massachusetts General Hospital. The data was published in Scientific Data on 30 October 2019.

== Applications ==
One advantage of MRI of the brain over computed tomography of the head is better tissue contrast, and it has fewer artifacts than CT when viewing the brainstem. MRI is also superior for pituitary imaging. It may however be less effective at identifying early cerebritis.

In the case of a concussion, an MRI should be avoided unless there are progressive neurological symptoms, focal neurological findings or concern of skull fracture on exam. In the analysis of a concussion, measurements of Fractional Anisotropy, Mean Diffusivity, Cerebral Blood Flow, and Global Connectivity can be taken to observe the pathophysiological mechanisms being made while in recovery.

In analysis of the fetal brain, MRI provides more information about gyration than ultrasound.

MRI is sensitive for the detection of brain abscess.

A number of different imaging modalities or sequences can be used with imaging the nervous system:

- T_{1}-weighted (T1W) images: Cerebrospinal fluid is dark. T_{1}-weighted images are useful for visualizing normal anatomy.
- T_{2}-weighted (T2W) images: CSF is light, but fat (and thus white matter) is darker than with T_{1}. T_{2}-weighted images are useful for visualizing pathology.
- Diffusion-weighted images (DWI): DWI uses the diffusion of water molecules to generate contrast in MR images.
- Proton density (PD) images: CSF has a relatively high level of protons, making CSF appear bright. Gray matter is brighter than white matter.

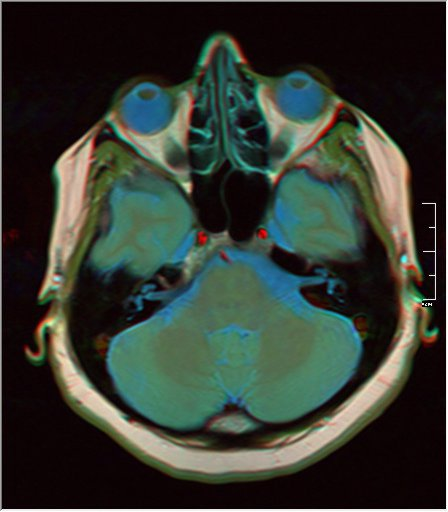
False color MRI by applying red to T1, green to PD and blue to T2.

- Fluid-attenuated inversion recovery (FLAIR): useful for evaluation of white matter plaques near the ventricles. It is useful in identifying demyelination.

== Diagnostics ==
MRI of the brain and head has multiple diagnostic usages, including identifying aneurysms, strokes, tumors and other brain injury. In many diseases, such as Parkinson's or Alzheimer's, MRI is useful to help differentially diagnose against other diseases. MRI data has been used with deep learning networks to identify brain tumors.

== See also ==
- Human Connectome Project
- History of neuroimaging

== Gallery ==
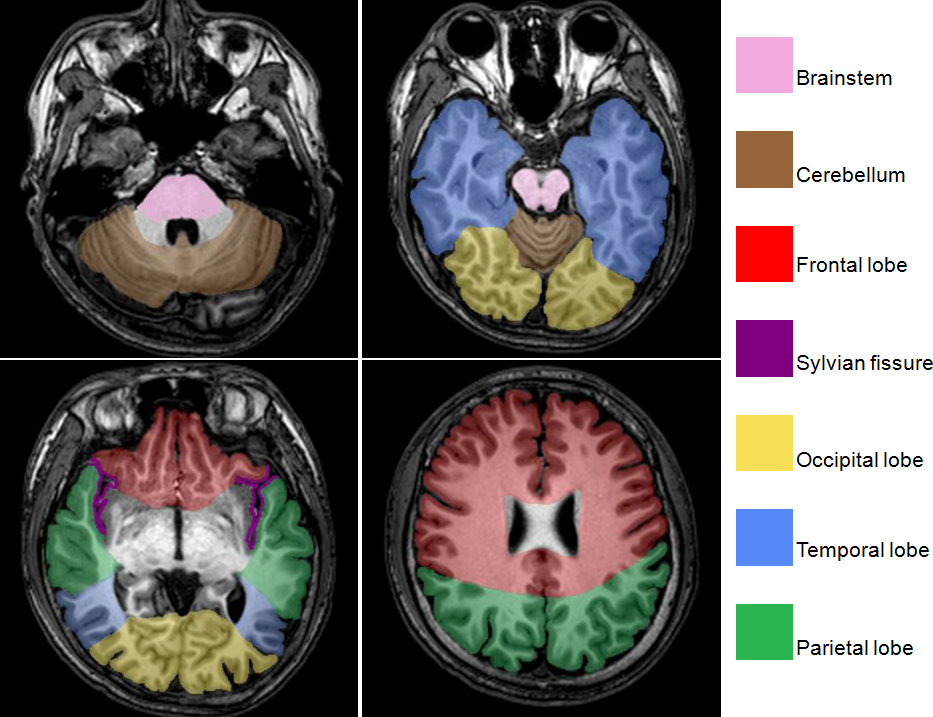
Brain regions on T1 MRI

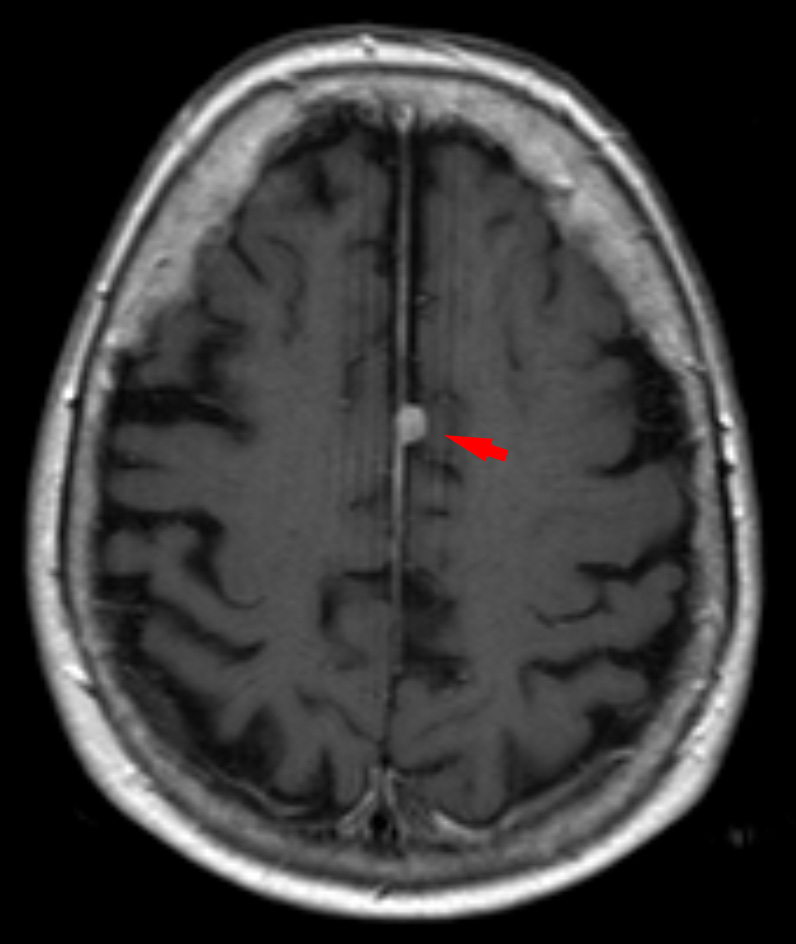
T1 (note CSF is dark) with contrast (arrow pointing to meningioma of the falx)

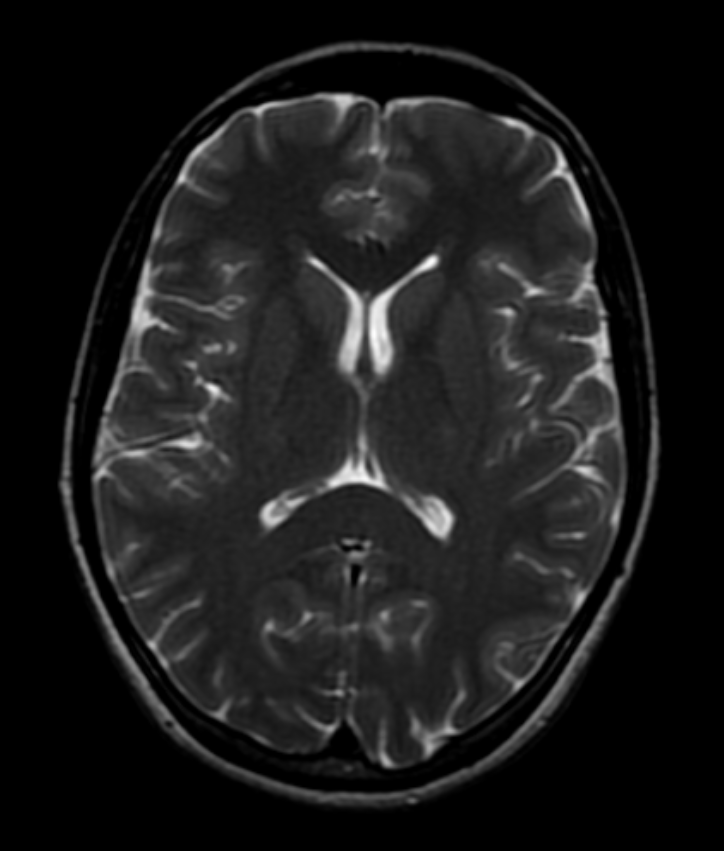
Normal axial T2-weighted MR image of the brain

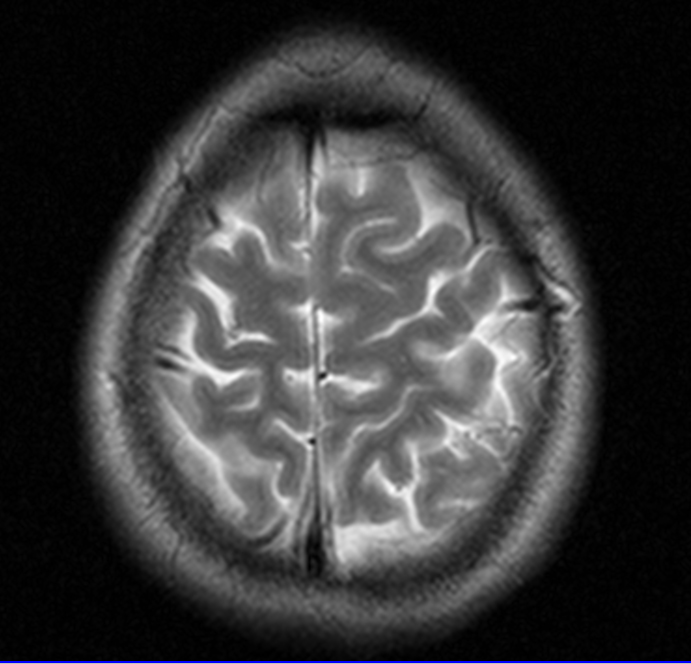
MRI image of the surface of the brain.
