= GRE (disambiguation) =

GRE is the Graduate Record Examinations, a standardized test created and administered by the Educational Testing Service in the United States.

GRE may also refer to:

== Organizations and enterprises ==
- GRE (company) (General Research of Electronics, Inc.), former Japanese electronics manufacturer
- GRE Alpha, a lighting company
- Guardian Royal Exchange Assurance, former British insurance company

== Science and technology ==
- Generic Routing Encapsulation, a type of tunnel used on routers
- Gradient recalled echo, or gradient echo, a type of magnetic resonance imaging sequence
- Glycpeptide resistant enterococci, also Vancomycin resistant enterococci (VRE), a bacterium resistant to antimicrobials

== Sport ==
- Greece national football team (FIFA country code GRE)
- Greece at the Olympics (IOC country code GRE)
- Greenland, IIGA country code

== Other uses ==
- Great Russian Encyclopedia

== See also ==
- Gree (disambiguation)
