= Intravoxel incoherent motion =

Method used in magnetic resonance imaging

Intravoxel incoherent motion (IVIM) imaging is a concept and a method initially introduced and developed by Le Bihan et al. to quantitatively assess all the microscopic translational motions that could contribute to the signal acquired with diffusion MRI. In this model, biological tissue contains two distinct environments: molecular diffusion of water in the tissue (sometimes referred to as 'true diffusion'), and microcirculation of blood in the capillary network (perfusion). The concept introduced by D. Le Bihan is that water flowing in capillaries (at the voxel level) mimics a random walk (“pseudo-diffusion”) (Fig.1), as long as the assumption that all directions are represented in the capillaries (i.e. there is no net coherent flow in any direction) is satisfied.

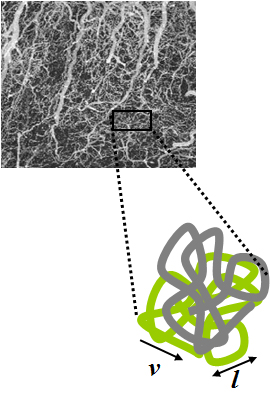
Fig. 1.

It is responsible for a signal attenuation in diffusion MRI, which depends on the velocity of the flowing blood and the vascular architecture. Similarly to molecular diffusion, the effect of pseudodiffusion on the signal attenuation depends on the b value. However, the rate of signal attenuation resulting from pseudodiffusion is typically an order of magnitude greater than molecular diffusion in tissues, so its relative contribution to the diffusion-weighted MRI signal becomes significant only at very low b values, allowing diffusion and perfusion effects to be separated.

== Model ==
In the presence of the magnetic field gradient pulses of a diffusion MRI sequence, the MRI signal gets attenuated due to diffusion and perfusion effects. In a simple model, this signal attenuation, S/So, can be written as:

$\frac{S}{S_0} = f_\mathrm{IVIM} F_\text{perf} + (1- f_\mathrm{IVIM}) F_\text{diff} \,$ [1]

where $f_\mathrm{IVIM}$ is the volume fraction of incoherently flowing blood in the tissue (“flowing vascular volume”),$F_\text{perf}$ the signal attenuation from the IVIM effect and $F_\text{diff}$ is the signal attenuation from molecular diffusion in the tissue.

Assuming blood water flowing in the randomly oriented vasculature changes several times direction (at least 2) during the measurement time (model 1), one has for $F_\text{perf}$ :

$F_\text{perf} = \exp (-b.D^*)\,$ [2]

where $b$ is the diffusion-sensitization of the MRI sequence, $D^*$ is the sum of the pseudo-diffusion coefficient associated to the IVIM effect and $D_\text{blood}$, the diffusion coefficient of water in blood:

$D^* = L.v_\text{blood}/6 + D_\text{blood} \,$ [3]

where $L$ is the mean capillary segment length and $v_\text{blood}$ is the blood velocity.

If blood water flows without changing direction (either because flow is slow or measurement time is short) while capillary segments are randomly and isotropically oriented (model 2), $F_\text{perf}$ becomes:

$F_\text{perf} = \operatorname{sinc}(v_\text{blood}c/\pi )\approx (1- v_\text{blood}c/6) \,$ [4]

where $c$ is a parameter linked to the gradient pulse amplitude and time course (similar to the b value).

In both cases, the perfusion effect results in a curvature of the diffusion attenuation plot towards b=0 (Fig.2).

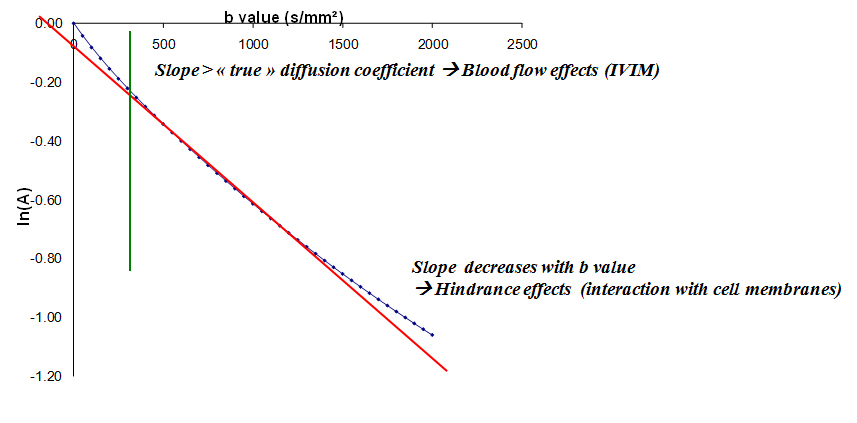
Fig. 2.

In a simple approach and under some approximations, the ADC calculated from 2 diffusion-weighted images acquired with b0=0 and b1, as ADC = ln(S(b0)/S (b1)), is:

$ADC \approx D + f_\mathrm{IVIM}/b \,$ [5]

where $D$ is the tissue diffusion coefficient. The ADC thus only depends on the flowing vascular volume (tissue vascularity) and not on the blood velocity and capillary geometry, which is a strong advantage. The contribution of perfusion to the ADC is larger when using small b values. On the other hand, set of data obtained from images acquired with a multiple b values can be fitted with Eq.[1] using either model 1 (Eq.[2,3]) or model 2(Eq.[4]) to estimate $D*$ and/or blood velocity. The late part of the curve (towards high b values, generally above 1000 s/mm^{2}) also presents some degree of curvature (Fig.2). This is because diffusion in biological tissues is not free (Gaussian), but can be hindered by many obstacles (in particular cell membranes) or even restricted (i.e. intracellular). Several models have been proposed to describe this curvature at higher b-values, mainly the “biexponential” model which assumes the presence of 2 water compartments with fast and slow diffusion (where neither compartment is the $f_\text{fast}$ from IVIM), the relative 'fast' and 'slow' labels referring to restricted and hindered diffusion, rather than pseudodiffusion/perfusion and true (hindered) diffusion. Another alternative is the “kurtosis” model which quantifies the deviation from free (Gaussian) diffusion in the parameter $K$ (Eq. [7]).

Biexponential model:

$F_\text{diff} = f_\text{slow} \exp (-bD_\text{slow}) + f_\text{fast} \exp (-bD_\text{fast}) \,$ [6]

Where $f_\mathrm{fast , slow}$ and $D_\mathrm{fast, slow}$ are the relative fractions and diffusion coefficients of the fast and slow compartments. This general formulation of a biexponential decay of diffusion-weighted imaging signal with b-value can be used for IVIM, which requires sampling of low b-values (<100 s/mm^{2}) to capture pseudodiffusion decay, or for restriction imaging, which requires higher b-value acquisitions (>1000 s/mm^{2}) to capture restricted diffusion.

Kurtosis model:

$F_\text{diff} = \exp (-bD_\mathrm{int}+ K(bD_\mathrm{int})^2/6) \,$ [7]

where $D_\mathrm{int}$ is the tissue intrinsic diffusion coefficient and $K$ the Kurtosis parameter (deviation from Gaussian diffusion). Both models can be related assuming some hypotheses about the tissue structure and the measurement conditions. Separation of perfusion from diffusion requires good signal-to-noise ratios and there are some technical challenges to overcome (artifacts, influence of other bulk flow phenomena, etc.). Also the “perfusion” parameters accessible with the IVIM method somewhat differs from the “classical” perfusion parameters obtained with tracer methods: “Perfusion” can be seen with the physiologist eyes (blood flow) or the radiologist eyes (vascular density). Indeed, there is room to improve the IVIM model and understand better its relationship with the functional vascular architecture and its biological relevance.

== Applications ==
IVIM MRI was initially introduced to evaluate perfusion and produce maps of brain perfusion, for brain activation studies (before the introduction of BOLD fMRI) and clinical applications (stroke, brain tumors). Recent work has proven the validity of the IVIM concept from fMRI, with an increase in the IVIM perfusion parameters in brain activated regions, and the potential of the approach to aid in our understanding of the different vascular contributions to the fMRI signal. IVIM MRI has also been used in the context of fMRI in a negative way.

A limitation of BOLD fMRI is its spatial resolution, as flow increase in somewhat large arteries or veins feed or drain large neuronal territories. By inserting “diffusion” gradient pulses in the MRI sequence (corresponding to low b-values), one may crush the contribution of the largest vessels (with high D* values associated with fast flow) in the BOLD signal and improve the spatial resolution of the activation maps. Several groups have relied on this trick, though not always considering referring to the IVIM concept. This IVIM concept has also been borrowed to improve other applications, for instance, arterial spin labeling (ASL) or to suppress signal from extracellular flowing fluid in perfused cell systems.

However, IVIM MRI has recently undergone a striking revival for applications not in the brain, but throughout the body as well. Following earlier encouraging results in the kidneys, or even the heart, IVIM MRI really took off for liver applications. For instance, Luciani et al. found that D* was significantly reduced in cirrhotic patients, which, according to the IVIM model, points out to reduce blood velocity (and flow). (Another theoretical, rather unlikely interpretation would be that capillary segments become longer or more straight in those patients with liver fibrosis). The perfusion fraction, f, which is linked to blood volume in the IVIM model, remained normal, confirming earlier results by Yamada et al. Though, blood volume is expected to be reduced in liver cirrhosis.

One has to keep in mind that IVIM imaging has a differential sensitivity to vessel types, according to the range of motion sensitization (b values) which are used. Signal from large vessels with rapid flow disappears quickly with very low b values, while smaller vessels with slower flow might still contribute to the IVIM signal acquired with b values larger than 200 s/mm^{2}. It has also been shown that the parameter f, often related to perfusion fraction, is sensitive to differential spin-spin relaxation rates in the two model compartments (blood/tissue) and can thus be overestimated in highly perfused tissue. Correction of this effect is achieved by additional images at a different echo time. Many more applications are now under investigation, especially for imaging of patients suspected of cancer in the body (prostate, liver, kidney, pancreas, etc.) and human placenta. A key feature of IVIM diffusion MRI is that it does not involve contrast agents, and it may appear as an interesting alternative for perfusion MRI in some patients at risk for Nephrogenic Systemic Fibrosis (NSF).
