= TMEM230 =

Protein-coding gene in the species Homo sapiens

Identifiers
- Aliases: TMEM230, C20orf30, HSPC274, dJ1116H23.2.1, transmembrane protein 230
- External IDs: OMIM: 617019; MGI: 1917862; GeneCards: TMEM230

Gene location (Human)
| Chr. | Chromosome 20 (human) |
| Band | 20p13-p12.3 | Start | 5,068,232 bp |
| Band | 20p13-p12.3 | End | 5,113,103 bp |

Gene location (Mouse)
| Chr. | Chromosome 2 (mouse) |
| Band | 2|2 F2 | Start | 132,081,412 bp |
| Band | 2|2 F2 | End | 132,089,727 bp |
RNA expression pattern
| Bgee | Human / Mouse (ortholog); Top expressed in: gallbladder; C1 segment; right adrenal cortex; smooth muscle tissue; substantia nigra; left adrenal gland; left adrenal cortex; islet of Langerhans; hypothalamus; endometrium / Top expressed in: spermatocyte; neural layer of retina; zygote; secondary oocyte; primary oocyte; spermatid; genital tubercle; yolk sac; skeletal muscle tissue; tail of embryo; More reference expression data |
| BioGPS | n/a |
Orthologs
| Databases | NCBI: entry; OMA: entry |
| Species | Human | Mouse |
| Entrez | 29058 | 70612 |
| Ensembl | ENSG00000089063 | ENSMUSG00000027341 |
| UniProt | Q96A57 | Q8CIB6 |
| RefSeq (mRNA) | NM_001009923; NM_001009924; NM_001009925; NM_014145; NM_001330984 NM_001330985; NM_001330986; NM_001330987 | NM_001141971; NM_027478 |
| RefSeq (protein) | NP_001009923; NP_001009924; NP_001009925; NP_001317913; NP_001317914 NP_001317915; NP_001317916; NP_054864 | NP_001135443; NP_081754 |
| Location (UCSC) | Chr 20: 5.07 – 5.11 Mb | Chr 2: 132.08 – 132.09 Mb |
| PubMed search |
- Wikidata
| View/Edit Human | View/Edit Mouse |

TMEM230 or transmembrane protein 230 is a protein that in humans is encoded by the TMEM230 gene.

== Function ==
The TMEM230 gene encodes a multi-pass transmembrane protein that belongs to the TMEM134/TMEM230 protein family. The encoded protein localizes to secretory and recycling vesicles in the neuron, and may be involved in synaptic vesicle trafficking and recycling. Mutations in this gene may be linked to familial Parkinson's disease.

More recent research demonstrates that TMEM230 has a role in the secretory pathway of cells, and in human normal and disease development associated with the cellular functions of sprouting, migration and tissue remodeling. Single-cell transcriptomic analysis supports the theory that aberrantly elevated levels of TMEM230 promotes autoimmunity, such as rheumatoid arthritis. TMEM230 has also been identified in the most aggressive brain cancer. In a study of human patient transcriptomic sequencing analysis with glioblastoma multiforme (GBM) combined with in vitro tumor glioma cell analysis, high expression of TMEM230 was correlated with vascular mimicry behavior and aggressive formation of "leaky blood vessels". Shortened life-span and high mortality observed in patients with GBM was hypothesized to be due to high TMEM230 expression promoting unregulated secretion of cellular factors and vesicles with destructive tissue remodeling capacity.

TMEM230 was identified with genes co-regulated with endoplasmic reticulum and the Golgi complex, motor proteins, metalloproteins (such as metalloproteinases), and mitochondria and extracellular secretion activities.

In U-87 MG cells (a human glioblastoma cell line), down-regulation of TMEM230 resulted in loss of tumor properties of these cells and the inability of U-87 MG to promote tumor associated angiogenesis in 3D human organoids brain like tumor models. As TMEM230 was identified down-stream to the VEGF (Vascular Endothelial Growth Factor) signaling pathway in tumor cells and human umbilical vein endothelial cells (HUVECs), TMEM230 is hypothesized to be a target for anticancer and tumor associated angiogenesis research and may represent an alternative to anti-VEGF for tumor treatment.

In normal vertebrate embryo development, TMEM230 was identified as a master regulator of normal blood vessel formation, and in particular in stalk and sprout cell fate determination associated with lateral inhibition associated with NOTCH signaling. Specific levels of TMEM230 mRNA was necessary for endothelial cell movement and fusion of blood vessels in zebrafish, a model of early embryo development for blood vessel formation.
