= Computational modeling of ischemic stroke =

Computational modeling of ischemic stroke has been used to understand the biological events during an ischemic stroke, and to identify potential drug targets. These models typically utilize compartment models with ordinary differential equations and partial differential equations. Models of spreading depressions and ion dynamics have shown that neuronal activity decreases and swelling increases due to an influx of calcium, sodium, and chlorine, and an efflux of potassium and glutamate in neurons during severe and moderate ischemic stroke event. Computational modeling of pH during a stroke also showed that, due to decreases in metabolic activity and increases in lactate and carbon dioxide concentrations in neurons, the pH of the penumbra decreases. These results agree with in vitro and in vivo studies. These computational models can be used in helping to identify proteins or receptors to target by integrating numerous complex mechanisms specific to an ischemic stroke event.

Drug targeting using ADME has been used in identifying drugs to target specific receptors or proteins that have been identified in an ischemic stroke event. For example, stroke can induce an overexpression of NF-κB. This overexpression causes inflammation and neuronal apoptosis. By using ADME, researchers were able to synthesize and identify a drug target that had high binding affinity to NF-κB to prevent its translocation. This technique was also used to identify molecules with high affinity to the choline receptor found in the blood–brain barrier to help in moving therapeutic targets into the brain injury site.
