= Jean-Claude Baron =

French stroke researcher

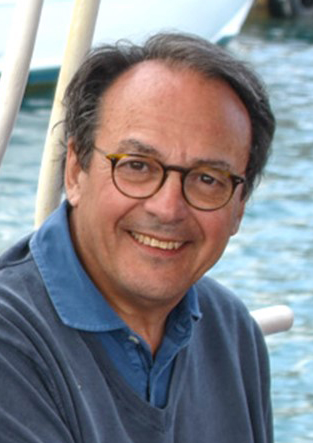
Jean-Claude Baron (2022)

Jean-Claude Baron is an Emeritus Professor of Stroke Medicine at the University of Cambridge. He is also a Fellow of the Academy of Medical Sciences. He has authored around 450 peer-reviewed articles.

== Education ==
Jean-Claude Baron studied clinical neurology at the Pitié-Salpêtrière Hospital in Paris, medical physics at the Commissariat à l'énergie atomique et aux énergies alternatives in Orsay, and functional brain imaging at Harvard University in the United States. He received his medical education and training at the University of Paris, where he also specialized in Neurology.

== Research and career ==
Jean-Claude Baron's principal research interests are in the pathophysiology of stroke and the processes of functional recovery after stroke, which he has mostly studied using imaging techniques.

He primarily used positron emission tomography (PET) in the study of cerebrovascular diseases, using it in conjunction with other techniques such as CT, MR, and SPECT to investigate the pathophysiology of transient ischemic attacks (TIAs) and acute ischemic stroke, as well as the mechanisms underlying post-stroke recovery, in both patients and animal models.

His main findings include the discovery of the ischemic penumbra in humans and the crucial role of hemodynamic impairment in carotid-territory TIAs, as well as crossed cerebellar diaschisis and thalamo-cortical diaschisis.

He has used functional and structural brain imaging to examine the mechanisms underlying cerebral amyloid angiopathy and neurodegenerative illnesses such as Alzheimer's, Parkinson's, and Progressive Supranuclear Palsy.

Jean-Claude Baron has over 40 years of professional experience and is currently director of research at INSERM and Paris University.

== Awards and honors ==
Jean-Claude Baron has earned various accolades including the following.

- Elected Member of the Academia Europeae (2023)
- Lifetime Achievement Award of the International Society for Cerebral Blood Flow and Metabolism (2023)
- Fellow of the Academy of Medical Sciences
- Mémain-Pelletier Award for Biomedical Sciences from the French Academy of Sciences (2014)
- Johannes Wepfer Award (2005)
- Ferdinand Dreyfous Award from the French Academy of Medicine (1979)
- David G. Sherman Award of the American Heart and Stroke Association (2025)

== Selected publications ==
- Baron, J. C.; Chételat, G.; Desgranges, B.; Perchey, G.; Landeau, B.; de la Sayette, V.; Eustache, F. (2001-08-01). "In Vivo Mapping of Gray Matter Loss with Voxel-Based Morphometry in Mild Alzheimer's Disease". NeuroImage. 14 (2): 298–309. doi:10.1006/nimg.2001.0848. ISSN 1053-8119. PMID 11467904. S2CID 21101432.
- Baron, J C; Bousser, M G; Rey, A; Guillard, A; Comar, D; Castaigne, P (1981-07-01). "Reversal of focal "misery-perfusion syndrome" by extra-intracranial arterial bypass in hemodynamic cerebral ischemia. A case study with 15O positron emission tomography". Stroke. 12 (4): 454–459. doi:10.1161/01.STR.12.4.454. PMID 6976022. S2CID 9904657.
- Baron, J. C.; Bousser, M. G.; Comar, D.; Castaigne, P. (1981). ""Crossed cerebellar diaschisis" in human supratentorial brain infarction". Transactions of the American Neurological Association. 105: 459–461. ISSN 0065-9479. PMID 19645126.
- Baron, J. C.; Bousser, M. G.; Comar, D.; Soussaline, F.; Castaigne, P. (1981). "Noninvasive tomographic study of cerebral blood flow and oxygen metabolism in vivo. Potentials, limitations, and clinical applications in cerebral ischemic disorders". European Neurology. 20 (3): 273–284. doi:10.1159/000115247. ISSN 0014-3022. PMID 6973468.
- Baron, J. C.; D'Antona, R.; Pantano, P.; Serdaru, M.; Samson, Y.; Bousser, M. G. (December 1986). "Effects of thalamic stroke on energy metabolism of the cerebral cortex. A positron tomography study in man". Brain: A Journal of Neurology. 109 (Pt 6): 1243–1259. doi:10.1093/brain/109.6.1243. ISSN 0006-8950. PMID 3491655.
- Baron, Jean-Claude (1999). "Mapping the Ischaemic Penumbra with PET: Implications for Acute Stroke Treatment". Cerebrovascular Diseases. 9 (4): 193–201. doi:10.1159/000015955. ISSN 1015-9770. PMID 10393405. S2CID 44698118.
