= K-space in magnetic resonance imaging =

Data manipulation in radiology

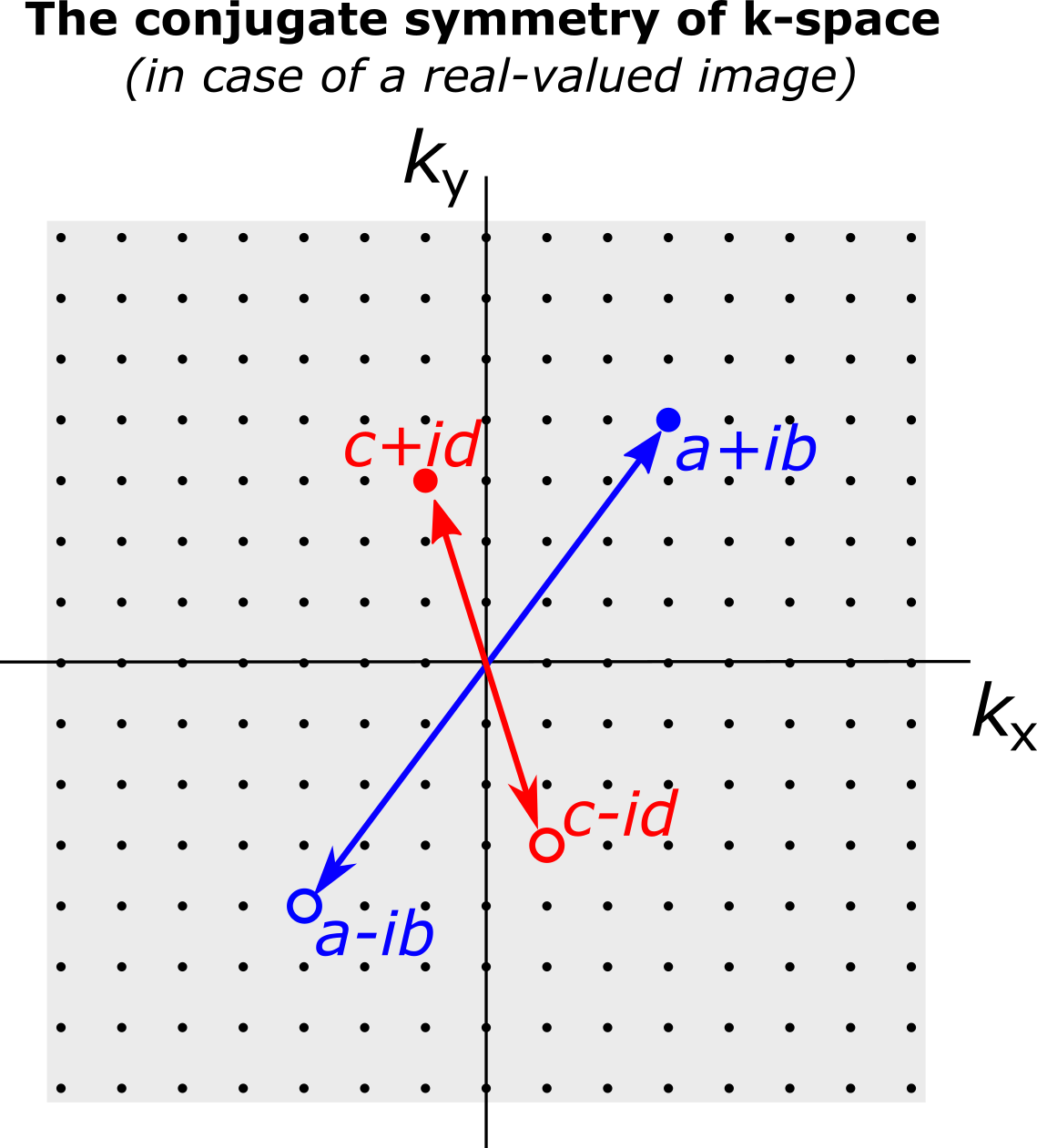
For a real image, the corresponding k-space is conjugate symmetric: the imaginary component at opposite k-space coordinates has the opposite sign.

In magnetic resonance imaging (MRI), the k-space or reciprocal space (a mathematical space of spatial frequencies) is obtained as the 2D or 3D Fourier transform of the image measured. It was introduced in 1979 by Likes and in 1983 by Ljunggren and Twieg.

In MRI physics, complex values are sampled in k-space during an MR measurement in a premeditated scheme controlled by a pulse sequence, i.e. an accurately timed sequence of radiofrequency and gradient pulses. In practice, k-space often refers to the temporary image space, usually a matrix, in which data from digitized MR signals are stored during data acquisition. When k-space is full (at the end of the scan) the data are mathematically processed to produce a final image. Thus k-space holds raw data before reconstruction.

It can be formulated by defining wave vectors $k_\mathrm{FE}$ and $k_\mathrm{PE}$ for "frequency encoding" (FE) and "phase encoding" (PE):

$$k_\mathrm{FE}=\bar{\gamma} G_\mathrm{FE}m\Delta t$$
$$k_\mathrm{PE}=\bar{\gamma} n\Delta G_\mathrm{PE} \tau$$

where $\Delta t$ is the sampling time (the reciprocal of sampling frequency), $\tau$ is the duration of G_{PE}, $\bar{\gamma}$ (gamma bar) is the gyromagnetic ratio, m is the sample number in the FE direction and n is the sample number in the PE direction (also known as partition number). Then, the 2D-Fourier Transform of this encoded signal results in a representation of the spin density distribution in two dimensions. Thus position (x,y) and spatial frequency ($k_\mathrm{FE}$, $k_\mathrm{PE}$) constitute a Fourier transform pair.

Typically, k-space has the same number of rows and columns as the final image and is filled with raw data during the scan, usually one line per TR (Repetition Time).

An MR image is a complex-valued map of the spatial distribution of the transverse magnetization M_{xy} in the sample at a specific time point after an excitation. Conventional qualitative interpretation of Fourier Analysis asserts that low spatial frequencies (near the center of k-space) contain the signal to noise and contrast information of the image, whereas high spatial frequencies (outer peripheral regions of k-space) contain the information determining the image resolution. This is the basis for advanced scanning techniques, such as the keyhole acquisition, in which a first complete k-space is acquired, and subsequent scans are performed for acquiring just the central part of the k-space; in this way, different contrast images can be acquired without the need of running full scans.

A nice symmetry property exists in k-space if the image magnetization M_{xy} is prepared to be proportional simply to a contrast-weighted proton density and thus is a real quantity. In such a case, the signal at two opposite locations in k-space is:

$$S(-k_\mathrm{FE},-k_\mathrm{PE}) = S^*(k_\mathrm{FE},k_\mathrm{PE}) \,$$

where the star ($^*$) denotes complex conjugation. Thus k-space information is somewhat redundant; an image can be reconstructed using only one half of the k-space. Such is in either the PE (Phase Encode) direction, saving scan time (such a technique is known as half Fourier, or half scan) or in the FE (Frequency Encode) direction, allowing for lower sampling frequencies and/or shorter echo times (such a technique is known as half echo). However, these techniques are approximate due to phase errors in the MRI data which can rarely be completely controlled (due to imperfect static field shim, effects of spatially selective excitation, signal detection coil properties, motion etc.) or nonzero phase due to just physical reasons (such as the different chemical shift of fat and water in gradient echo techniques).

MRI k-space is related to NMR time-domain in all aspects, both being used for raw data storage. The only difference between the MRI k-space and the NMR time domain is that a gradient G is present in MRI data acquisition, but is absent in NMR data acquisition. As a result of this difference, the NMR FID signal and the MRI spin-echo signal take different mathematical forms:

$$\text{FID}=M_\mathrm{0}\cos(\omega_\mathrm{0}t)\exp(-t/T_\mathrm{2})$$

and

$$\text{Spin-Echo}= M_\mathrm{0}\sin(\omega_\mathrm{r}t)/(\omega_\mathrm{r}t)$$

where

$$\omega_\mathrm{r}=\omega_\mathrm{0} + \bar{\gamma} rG$$

Due to the presence of the gradient G, the spatial information r (not the spatial frequency information k) is encoded onto the frequency $\omega$, and at the same time the time-domain is renamed as k-space.
