= Whistler Group =

American electronics company

The Whistler Group Inc
- Company type: Private
- Industry: Electronics
- Headquarters: Bentonville, Arkansas, USA
- Products: Radar detectors, power inverters, scanner radios, and GPS navigation devices
- Website: www.Whistlergroup.com

The Whistler Group was an electronics company based in Bentonville, Arkansas, best known for its radar detectors. Whistler also manufactured power inverters, GPS navigation devices, inspection cameras, LED flashlights, vehicle dashboard cameras, and scanner radios. The company went out of business in 2024 without warning.

== Scanner Radios ==
In late 2013 Whister Group acquired the scanner radio technical assets from GRE who closed their factory in 2012. In early 2014 Whister began manufacturing scanner radios very similar to those produced by GRE. Whistler manufactured scanners for Radio Shack.
