= Gree =

Gree or GREE may refer to:

== Business and companies ==
- Gree Electric, a Chinese appliance manufacturer company
- Gree Group, a Chinese state-owned enterprise
- Gree (Japanese company), a Japanese social media company
  - Gree (social network), a Japanese social network service

== People ==
- Alain Grée (1936–2025), French illustrator and author
- Commander Gree, a Clone trooper from the Star Wars universe
- MC Gree (born 1998), South Korean rapper

== See also ==
- GRE (disambiguation)
