= Inductive sensor =

Device which uses electromagnetic induction to sense objects

Elements of a simple inductive proximity sensor.: 1. Field sensor; 2. Oscillator; 3. Demodulator; 4. Schmitt Trigger; 5. Output

An inductive sensor is an electronic device that operates based on the principle of electromagnetic induction to detect or measure nearby metallic objects. An inductor develops a magnetic field when an electric current flows through it; alternatively, a current will flow through a circuit containing an inductor when the magnetic field through it changes. This effect can be used to detect metallic objects that interact with a magnetic field. Non-metallic substances, such as liquids or some kinds of dirt, do not interact with the magnetic field, so an inductive sensor can operate in wet or dirty conditions.

== Principle ==
The inductive sensor is based on Faraday's law of induction. The temporal variations of the magnetic flux Φ through a coil with N turns will induce a voltage $\mathcal{E}$ which follows:

$$\mathcal{E} = - N\frac{d \Phi}{dt}$$

which can be expressed in a simpler way:

$$\mathcal{E} = - N\times S\frac{dB}{dt}$$

by assuming that the induced magnetic field B is homogeneous over a section S (the magnetic flux will be expressed $\Phi = B\times S$).

One form of inductive sensor drives a coil with an oscillator. A metallic object approaching the coil will alter the inductance of the coil, producing a change in frequency or a change in the current in the coil. These changes can be detected, amplified, compared to a threshold and used to switch an external circuit. The coil may have a ferromagnetic core to make the magnetic field more intense and to increase the sensitivity of the device. A coil with no ferromagnetic core ("air core") can also be used, especially if the oscillator coil must cover a large area.

Another form of inductive sensor uses one coil to produce a changing magnetic field, and a second coil (or other device) to sense the changes in the magnetic field produced by an object, for example, due to eddy currents induced in a metal object.

== Applications ==
=== Search coil magnetometer ===
Inductive sensors constitute the main element to build a search coil magnetometer, also known as a search coil. These are used in many fields of research: magnetotellurics, electromagnetic waves measurement, space magnetometers to investigate electromagnetic waves in space plasma as well as natural electromagnetic waves observations on Earth.

=== Inductive proximity sensor (proximity switch) ===
An inductive proximity sensor is a non-contact electronic proximity sensor. It is used for positioning and detection of metal objects. The sensing range of an inductive switch is dependent on the type of metal being detected. Ferrous metals, such as iron and steel, allow for a longer sensing range, while nonferrous metals, such as aluminum and copper, may reduce the sensing range by up to 60 percent.

Since the output of an inductive sensor has two possible states, an inductive sensor is sometimes referred to as an inductive proximity switch.

The sensor consists of an induction loop or detector coil. Most often this is physically a number of turns of insulated magnet wire wound around a high magnetic permeability core, such as a ferrite ceramic rod or coil form, and the winding may or may not have a feedback tap some number of turns from one end of the total winding. It is connected to a capacitance to form a tuned frequency oscillator tank circuit. In conjunction with a voltage or current gain device like a transistor or operational amplifier, this forms a tuned frequency oscillator. When power is applied, the resulting oscillation is a high frequency alternating electric current in the coil that has a constantly changing magnetic field able to induce eddy currents in proximal (target) conductors. The closer the target is and the greater its conductivity (metals are good conductors, for example), the greater the induced eddy currents are and the more effect their resulting opposing magnetic fields have on the magnitude and frequency of the oscillation. Its magnitude is reduced as the load is increased in a non-magnetic conductor like aluminum because the induced field in the target opposes the source induction field, lowering net inductive impedance and therefore simultaneously tuning the oscillation frequency higher. But that magnitude is less affected if the target is a highly magnetically permeable material, like iron, as that high permeability increases the coil inductance, lowering the frequency of oscillation.

A change in oscillation magnitude may be detected with a simple amplitude modulation detector like a diode that passes the peak voltage value to a small filter to produce a reflective DC voltage value, while a frequency change may be detected by one of several kinds frequency discriminator circuits, like a phase lock loop detector, to see in what direction and how much the frequency shifts. Either the magnitude change or the amount of frequency change can serve to define a proximity distance at which the sensors go from on to off, or vice versa.

Common applications of inductive sensors include metal detectors, traffic lights, car washes, and a host of automated industrial processes. Because the sensor does not require physical contact it is particularly useful for applications where access presents challenges or where dirt is prevalent.

== Traffic sensor ==
To control traffic signals at an intersection of roads, an induction loop can be buried in the pavement. A circuit connected to the loop can detect the change in its inductance when a vehicle passes over or stops on the loop. This can be used to detect vehicles and adjust the timing of traffic signals or provide a turning signal at a busy intersection.

== Nuclear magnetic resonance ==
Inductive sensors, also referred (in this area) as "NMR coils" or "radiofrequency coils", are used to detect the magnetic component of the electromagnetic field associated to the nuclear spin precession in Nuclear magnetic resonance.

== See also ==
- List of sensors
- Linear variable differential transformer
- Magnetic flow meter
- Magnetic Resonance Imaging
- Non Destructive Testing
