= T2*-weighted imaging =

Type of neuroimaging

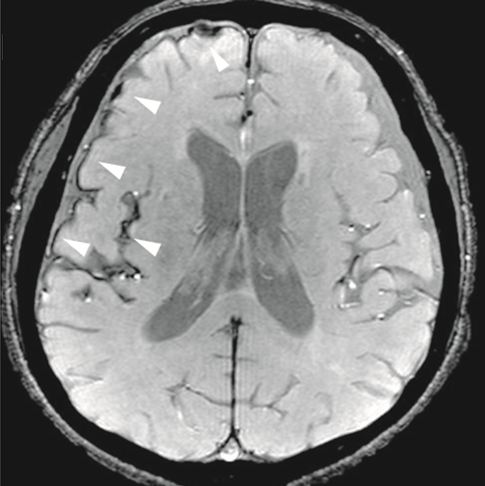
T2*-weighted imaging of the brain 26 weeks after subarachnoid hemorrhage, showing hemosiderin deposits as hypointense areas.

T_{2}*-weighted imaging is an MRI sequence to quantify observable or effective T_{2} (T2* or "T2-star"). In this sequence, hemorrhages and hemosiderin deposits become hypointense.

== Physics ==
T_{2}*-weighted imaging is built from the basic physics of magnetic resonance imaging where there is spin–spin relaxation, that is, the transverse component of the magnetization vector exponentially decays towards its equilibrium value. It is characterized by the spin–spin relaxation time, known as T_{2}. In an idealized system, all nuclei in a given chemical environment, in a magnetic field, relax with the same frequency. However, in real systems, there are minor differences in chemical environment which can lead to a distribution of resonance frequencies around the ideal. Over time, this distribution can lead to a dispersion of the tight distribution of magnetic spin vectors, and loss of signal (free induction decay). In fact, for most magnetic resonance experiments, this "relaxation" dominates. This results in dephasing.

However, decoherence because of magnetic field inhomogeneity is not a true "relaxation" process; it is not random, but dependent on the location of the molecule in the magnet. For molecules that aren't moving, the deviation from ideal relaxation is consistent over time, and the signal can be recovered by performing a spin echo experiment.

The corresponding transverse relaxation time constant is thus T_{2}^{*}, which is usually much smaller than T_{2}. The relation between them is:

$$\frac{1}{T_2^*}=\frac{1}{T_2}+\frac{1}{T_{\rm inhom}} = \frac{1}{T_2}+\gamma \Delta B_0$$

where γ represents gyromagnetic ratio, and ΔB_{0} the difference in strength of the locally varying field.

Unlike T_{2}, T_{2}* is influenced by magnetic field gradient irregularities. The T_{2}* relaxation time is always shorter than the T_{2} relaxation time and is typically milliseconds for water samples in imaging magnets.

T_{2}*-weighted imaging can be created as a postexcitation refocused gradient echo (GRE) sequence with small flip angle. The sequence of gradient echo T_{2}*-weighted imaging (GRE T2*WI) requires a high uniformity of the magnetic field.

== Clinical applications ==
T_{2}*-weighted sequences are used to detect deoxygenated hemoglobin, methemoglobin, or hemosiderin in lesions and tissues. Diseases with such patterns include intracranial hemorrhage, arteriovenous malformation, cavernoma, hemorrhage in a tumor, punctate hemorrhages in diffuse axonal injury, superficial siderosis, thrombosed aneurysm, phleboliths in vascular lesions, and some forms of calcification. T_{2}*-weighted GRE sequences can detect microhemorrhages as seen in most vestibular schwannomas, thereby differentiating them from meningiomas.

The T_{2}*-weighted GRE sequence can detect a "middle cerebral artery susceptibility sign", which is a dark linear filling defect that is wider than the corresponding artery on the contralateral side. This sign is 83% sensitive and 100% specific for thrombotic occlusion of the internal carotid artery.

It can detect hemosiderin deposition in joints as seen in arthropathy by hemophilia, as well as pigmented villonodular synovitis . T_{2}*-weighted sequences are very useful for evaluation of articular cartilages and ligaments because a relatively long T_{2}* makes the articular cartilage becomes more hyperintense, while bone becomes hypointense.

T_{2}*-weighted sequences can be used with MRI contrast, mainly ferucarbotran or superparamagnetic iron oxide (SPIO), to depict liver lesions.

== See also ==
- MRI sequence
