= Tissue remodeling =

Reorganization of the microstructure in tissues

Tissue remodeling is the reorganization or renovation of existing tissues. Tissue remodeling can be either physiological or pathological. The process of remodeling is generally intended to be the change microscopic properties of a tissue. Remodeling has often the function of optimizing the mechanical properties of the tissue reacting to external stimulus and adapting to it, as it is the case of bone and blood vessel remodeling. Other important examples of tissue that undergo remodeling include: connective tissue under tension or that is undergoing wound healing, during which the Macrophages remodel the tissue by producing extracellular matrix and proteases to modify that specific matrix.

Although remodeling happens in tissues that have very different functions, some general patterns can be identified. For those tissue that tend to optimize mechanical properties the cooperation of mechanotransductive components (serving as sensor) that communicate to actuators which will change physically the property (this two parts forming a control loop). This is the case of bone remodelling, where osteocytes perceive the principal direction of the stress applied to the bones and they comunicate it to the osteoblats and osteoclasts that reorient the trabecular structure as to align which such direction to make the tissue have a stiffer response to the strongest solicitations, without increasing weight needlessly (a phenomenon known historically as "Wolf's law"). Although the general abstraction can be this simple one must remember that the detalis of this type of processes are highly complex and only recently better understood.

Another general pattern observed is that, although remodeling is an inherently microscopical phenomena, there are emergent function and order that arises from the interaction single remodeling agents. The most common way in which this happen is due to single cells trying to reach a local homeostasis, and by doing so actually give rise to a macroscopic function (optimization, healing etc.) and more generally functional structural changes. One very good example of this is the case of fibroblasts in collagen matrix. The remodeling in this case, as explained in the reference, is due to the alignment of the collagen fibers with the principal directions of stress actuated by the fibroblasts. The interesting part is that they do so in such a way as to reach a "stress homeostasis": although the tissue is forced in tension they perceive none, but only after they have remodeled the neighboring as to create an effective stress shield by reinforcing the material where needed. When the tissue is relaxed again, they find themselves in an unnaturally stressed position and change their surroundings trying to reach again a zero stress state (the original one). In reaching such dynamic equilibrium fibroblasts further cooperate by disposing themselves in lines. In this way it's easier to "shield" themselves (as it is more efficient to build houses one right next to the other).

A myocardial infarction induces tissue remodeling of the heart in a three-phase process: inflammation, proliferation, and maturation. Inflammation is characterized by massive necrosis in the infarcted area. Inflammatory cells clear the dead cells. In the proliferation phase, inflammatory cells die by apoptosis, being replaced by myofibroblasts which produce large amounts of collagen. In the maturation phase, myofibroblast numbers are reduced by apoptosis, allowing for infiltration by endothelial cells (for blood vessels) and cardiomyocytes (heart tissue cells). Usually, however, much of the tissue remodeling is pathological, resulting in a large amount of fibrous tissue. By contrast, aerobic exercise can produce beneficial cardiac tissue remodeling in those suffering from left ventricular hypertrophy.

Programmed cellular senescence contributes to beneficial tissue remodeling during embryonic development of the fetus.

In a brain stroke the penumbra area surrounding the ischemic event initially undergoes a damaging remodeling, but later transitions to a tissue remodeling characterized by repair.

Vascular remodeling refers to a compensatory change in blood vessel walls due to plaque growth. Vascular expansion is called positive remodeling, whereas vascular constriction is called negative remodeling.

Tissue remodeling occurs in adipose tissue with increased body fat. In obese subjects, this remodeling is often pathological, characterized by excessive inflammation and fibrosis.

== See also ==
- Collagen hybridizing peptide, a molecular marker to directly image tissue remodeling
