= GRE (company) =

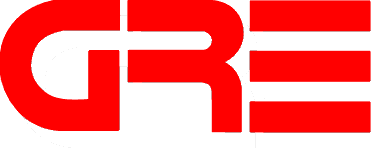

GRE (株式会社 ゼネラル リサ－チ オブ エレクトロニックス General Research of Electronics, Inc.) was a Japan-based multinational manufacturer of electronics equipment, primarily in the fields of radio and other telecommunications. Their products included transceivers, radio scanners, antennas, GPS devices, and satellite equipment. They also produced OEM equipment for other companies, including Radio Shack, Uniden and Commtel.

GRE was established in 1961, and its headquarters was located in Tokyo. GRE had a manufacturing facility in Chiba Prefecture which closed in October 2012. In late 1977, GRE established "GRE America, Inc.", its first overseas operation, with a head office in California. The company established its second overseas corporation, "GRE (Hong Kong), Ltd.", in 1986.

In 2006, Kazunori Imazeki became CEO and president of the company.

In October, 2012, its China factory was shuttered and GRE ceased all production. GRE America continued to service GRECOM products and to sell and service Alinco radio products for the North American market.

In May, 2013, GRE America Inc (USA Branch) moved from its Belmont, California location after losing Alinco's Distribution rights in North American market. GRE America relocated to San Leandro, California.

In January, 2014, Whistler Group took over production of GRE's scanner line. Due to several of GRE's engineers working with Whistler, the products produced by the overtaking company are very similar to that of GRE's at the time of operation cessation. Whistler later began selling radio scanners formerly produced for Radio Shack with separate product numbers but identical hardware.

In February, 2014, GRE (Japan) head office closed its Tokyo office and relocated to its Chiba location where they had once produced its product line when it first established back in 1961.

In September 2014, 'General Research of Electronics' Japan (GRE) decided to cease its USA business operations and closed its California office since there is no active business due to lack of financial resource and development capabilities at GRE Japan.
