= Arterial spin labelling =

Magnetic resonance imaging technique

Arterial spin labeling (ASL), also known as arterial spin tagging, is a magnetic resonance imaging technique used to quantify cerebral blood perfusion by labelling blood water as it flows throughout the brain. ASL specifically refers to magnetic labeling of arterial blood below or in the imaging slab, without the need of gadolinium contrast. A number of ASL schemes are possible, the simplest being flow alternating inversion recovery (FAIR) which requires two acquisitions of identical parameters with the exception of the out-of-slice saturation; the difference in the two images is theoretically only from inflowing spins, and may be considered a 'perfusion map'. The ASL technique was developed by John S. Leigh Jr, John A. Detre, Donald S. Williams, and Alan P. Koretsky in 1992.

== Physics ==
Arterial spin labeling utilizes the water molecules circulating with the brain, and using a radiofrequency pulse, tracks the blood water as it circulates throughout the brain. After a period of time in microseconds (enough to allow the blood to circulate through the brain), a 'label' image is captured. A 'control' image is also acquired before the labeling of the blood water. A subtraction technique gives a measurement of perfusion. In order to increase SNR, collections of control and label images can be averaged. There are also other specifications in the MRI that can increase SNR, like the amount of head coils of the MRI, or a stronger field strength (3 T is standard, but 1.5 T is satisfactory). In order to properly scale the perfusion values into cerebral blood flow units (CBF, ml/100g/1 min), a separate proton density map with the same parameters (but longer TR to fully relax the blood spins) is recommended to be acquired as well. Alternatively, the average control image can be used to generate CBF, which is the case for Phillips pCASL readouts. Usually background suppression is also applied to increase the SNR. Due to the different variations of each implementations, it is recommended that a large multi-scanner study should design a protocol minimizing the variety of readout methods used by each scanner.

One study has shown that although there are voxel differences when different readout methods are used, average gray matter CBF are still comparable. Differences in SNR are apparent when each voxel compared, but collectively are negligible.

=== Continuous arterial spin labelling ===
In continuous arterial spin labeling (CASL), the blood water is inverted as it flows through the brain in one plane. CASL is characterized by one single long pulse (around 1–3) seconds. This may be disadvantageous for certain scanners that are not designed to maintain a radiofrequency pulse that long, and therefore would require adjustments to a RF amplifier. This is rectified in pseudo-continuous arterial spin labeling (pCASL), where a single long pulse is replaced with multiple (up to a thousand) millisecond pulses. This leads to a higher labelling efficiency. pCASL is the preferred implementation of ASL. There are different readout modules for pCASL, depending on the scanner used, with 2D pCASL usually being implemented for all scanners and 3D pCASL stack of spirals implemented in GE scanners.

=== Pulsed arterial spin labelling ===
In pulse arterial spin labeling (PASL), blood water is inverted as it passes through a labeling slab (of 15 to 20 cm) instead of a plane. There are different variations of this implementations, including EPISTAR and PICORE and PULSAR. Most scanners have been designed to have PASL work out-of-the-box for research use.

=== Velocity selective arterial spin labelling ===
Velocity selective arterial spin labeling is a strategy that still requires validation. Velocity selective arterial spin labeling is advantageous in a population where blood flow may be impeded (e.g. stroke), because the labeling occurs closer to the capillaries. This allows the post labeling decay to be shorter.

=== Diffusion prepared pseudocontinuous arterial spin labelling (DP-pCASL) ===
Diffusion-prepared pseudocontinuous ASL (DP-pCASL) is a more recent ASL variant sequence that magnetically labels water molecules and measures their movement across the blood-brain barrier complex, which allows for the calculation of the water exchange rate (kw). kw is used as a surrogate for BBB function and permeability. Water exchange across the BBB is mediated by a number of processes, including passive diffusion, active co-transport through the endothelial membrane, and predominantly by facilitated diffusion through the dedicated water channel aquaporin-4 (AQP4). Several studies have investigated the use of DP-pCASL in cerebrovascular diseases, including acute ischemic stroke, CADASIL, hereditary cerebral small vessel disease as well as in animal models.

== Analysis of ASL images ==
ASL maps can mainly be analyzed using the same tools to analyze fMRI and VBM. Many ASL-specific toolboxes have been developed to assist in ASL analysis, such as BASIL (Bayesian inference for arterial spin labelling MRI), part of the FSL neuroimaging package and also Ze Wang's ASL toolbox (using MATLAB) to assist in the subtraction and averaging of the tagged/control pairs. A visual quality check is often needed to make sure that the perfusion map is valid (such as correct registration, or correct segmentation of non-cerebral materials such as the dura mater). A whole brain/voxel-wise approach can be analyzed by registering the ASL map into MNI space for group comparisons. A region of interest approach can be analyzed by registering the ASL map into a selected cluster, or an atlas, like a standard (such as the Harvard-Oxford Cortical atlas) or an individual atlas developed by software like FreeSurfer. The recommended procedure of ASL registration for voxel-wise analysis is to register the perfusion map to a gray matter segmentation of each individual in a non-rigid procedure.

Gray matter often requires more oxygenation and is the source of more brain activity compared to white matter. Therefore, gray matter CBF is often higher than white matter CBF. The single value of gray matter CBF is often isolated in order to give a broad overview of CBF differences. Gray matter and white matter CBF can be localized using atlases or Freesurfer.

ASL functional connectivity can be designed with parameters conducive to a long scan time. Studies have suggested that ASL complement resting state fMRI findings well but can differentiate between resting brain networks (such as the default mode network) less.

== Comparison with fMRI ==
Functional MRI (fMRI) has been the modality of choice to visualize brain activity, and takes advantages of a range of techniques that can be used to interpret it. However, the signal that fMRI is acquiring is BOLD signal, which does not directly correlate with blood flow. Cerebral blood flow on the other hand does, allowing for cardiovascular disease (CVD) and inflammatory risk factor analysis, and disorders (such as schizophrenia and bipolar disorder) that have comorbid effects with CVD. ASL imaging can be a useful tool to complement fMRI and vice versa.

== Clinical use ==
In cerebral infarction, the penumbra has decreased perfusion. Besides acute and chronic neurovascular diseases, the value of ASL has been demonstrated in brain tumors, epilepsy and neurodegenerative disease, such as Alzheimer's disease, frontotemporal dementia and Parkinson disease. Additionally, DP-pCASL has promising potential for assessing blood-brain barrier integrity in patients with ischemic stroke.

Although the primary form of fMRI uses the blood-oxygen-level dependent (BOLD) contrast, ASL is another method of obtaining contrast.

There have been research to apply ASL to renal imaging, pancreas imaging, and placenta imaging. A challenge to this sort of non-cerebral perfusion is motion due to breathing. Additionally, there is a lot less development on the segmentation of theses specific organs, so the studies are relatively small scale.

== Safety ==
ASL is in general a safe technique, although injuries may occur as a result of failed safety procedures or human error like other MRI techniques.

ASL, like other MRI modalities generate a fair amount of acoustic noise during the scan, so earplugs are advised.
