= Radiofrequency coil =

Transceiver in radio equipment

Radiofrequency coils (RF coils) are the receivers, and sometimes also the transmitters, of radiofrequency (RF) signals in equipment used in magnetic resonance imaging (MRI).

The MR signal in MRI is produced by the process of resonance, which is the result of radiofrequency pulses. They consist of two electromagnetic coils, the transmitter and receiver, which generate the field and receive the resulting signal. Atomic nuclei of interest in MRI studies have their own resonant frequencies, in the radiofrequency portion of the electromagnetic spectrum.

Although the electromagnetic fields produced by the transmitting coil are in the RF range of tens of megahertz (often in the shortwave radio portion of the electromagnetic spectrum) at powers usually exceeding the highest powers used by amateur radio, there is very little RF interference produced by the MRI machine. The reason for this is that the MRI is a poor radio transmitter and lacks an antenna. The RF frequency electromagnetic field produced in the "transmitting coil" is a magnetic near-field with very little associated changing electric field component (such as all conventional radio wave transmissions have). Thus, the high-powered electromagnetic field produced in the MRI transmitter coil does not produce much electromagnetic radiation at its RF frequency, and the RF power is confined to the coil space and not radiated as "radio waves." Thus, the transmitting coil is a good EM near-field generator at radio frequency, but a poor EM radiation transmitter at radio frequency.

The receiver coil picks up the oscillations at RF frequencies produced by precession of the magnetic moment of nuclei inside the subject. The signal acquired by the coil is thus an induced emf, and is not the result of picking up radio waves. This is a common misconception, and unfortunately, has propagated through the literature. MRI scanners are generally situated in metal mesh lined rooms which act as Faraday cages.)

== Types ==
RF coils for MRI can be grouped into two different classes: volume coils and surface coils.

=== Volume Coils ===
Volume coils are designed to provide a homogeneous RF excitation across a large volume. Most clinical MRI scanners include a built in volume coil to perform whole-body imaging, and smaller volume coils have been constructed for the head and other extremities.

Common designs for volume coils include Birdcage Coils, TEM Coils, Saddle Coils and 2D cylindrical High Pass Ladder. These coils require a great deal of RF power because of their size, so they are often driven in quadrature in order to reduce by two the RF power requirements.

The condition to attain a high RF magnetic field homogeneity is to approximate spatial cosine current distribution in radiofrequency coil. The RF homogeneity of volume coils is highly desirable for transmission, but is less ideal when the region of interest is small. The large field of view of volume coils means that they receive noise from the whole body, not just the region of interest.

=== Surface Coils ===
Surface coils are designed to provide a very high RF sensitivity over a small region of interest. These coils are often single or multi-turn loops which are placed directly over the anatomy of interest. The size of these coils can be optimized for the specific region of interest.

Surface coils make poor transmission coils because they have poor RF homogeneity, even over their region of interest. Their small field of view makes them ideal as receivers, as they only detect noise from the region of interest.

== See also ==
- MRI
- Radio frequency
- Inductive sensor
