= Penumbra (medicine) =

Partially affected area surrounding an ischamic event

In pathology and anatomy the penumbra is the area surrounding an ischemic event such as thrombotic or embolic stroke. Immediately following the event, blood flow and therefore oxygen transport is reduced locally, leading to hypoxia of the cells near the location of the original insult. This can lead to hypoxic cell death (infarction) and amplify the original damage from the ischemia; however, the penumbra area may remain viable for several hours after an ischemic event due to the collateral arteries that supply the penumbral zone.

As time elapses after the onset of stroke, the extent of the penumbra tends to decrease; therefore, in the emergency department a major concern is to protect the penumbra by increasing oxygen transport and delivery to cells in the danger zone, thereby limiting cell death. The existence of a penumbra implies that salvage of the cells is possible. There is a high correlation between the extent of spontaneous neurological recovery and the volume of penumbra that escapes infarction; therefore, saving the penumbra should improve the clinical outcome.

== Definition ==
One widely accepted definition for penumbra describes the area as "ischemic tissue potentially destined for infarction but it isn't irreversibly injured and [is therefore] the target of any acute therapies." The original definition of the penumbra referred to areas of the brain that were damaged but not yet dead, and offered promise to rescue the brain tissue with the appropriate therapies.

== Blood flow ==
The penumbra region typically occurs when blood flow drops below 20 mL/100 g/min. At this point electrical communication between neurons fails to exist. Cells in this region are alive but metabolic pumps are inhibited, oxidative metabolism is reduced but neurons may begin to depolarize again. Areas of the brain generally do not become infarcted until blood flow to the region drops below 10 to 12 mL/100 g/min. At this point, glutamate release becomes unregulated, ion pumps are inhibited and adenosine triphosphate (ATP) synthesis also stops which ultimately leads to the disruption of intracellular processes and neuronal death.

== Identification by imaging ==
Positron emission tomography (PET) can quantify the size of the penumbra, but is neither widely available nor rapidly accessible. Magnetic resonance imaging can estimate the size of the penumbra with a combination of two MRI sequences:

- Perfusion weighted imaging (PWI) shows decreased blood perfusion in the infarcted core and the penumbra
- Diffusion weighted imaging (DWI) can estimate the size of the infarcted core.

Both of these sequences somewhat overestimates their volumes of interest, but the size of the penumbra can roughly be estimated by subtracting abnormal volume by DWI from abnormal volume by PWI.

The penumbral area can also be detected based upon an integration of three factors. These factors include: the site of vessel occlusion, the extent of oligaemia (hypoperfused area surrounding the penumbra, but not at risk of infarction) at that moment, and the mismatch between this perfusion defect and the area of the brain already infarcted.

== Clinical relevance ==
A higher volume of penumbra around a cerebral infarction means a greater volume of potentially salvageable brain matter by thrombolysis and thrombectomy. Such therapies have a greater effect on regaining functions such as movement after a cerebral infarction. After the initial ischemic event the penumbra transitions from a tissue remodeling characterized by damage to a remodeling characterized by repair.

In the penumbra, microglia are thought to exert neuroprotective effects via specialized contacts with neuronal somata, termed somatic junctions. Understanding and supporting these microglial actions could broaden the therapeutic window and lead to higher amount of preserved nervous tissue.

== History ==
The concept of the ischemic penumbra was developed in Lindsay Symons laboratory, The National Hospital, Queens Square, London, in 1976 by combined focal measurements of neurofunction, blood flow and extracellular K^{+} in the baboon brain following a MCA occlusion. Critical levels of blood flow was observed for function and energy metabolism. These results and the first mentioning of the term ischemic penumbra were published in 1977 in Stroke (1), and further substantiated by an editorial in 1981 (2). The first decade of research focused on physiologic profile of the penumbra tissue after stroke, mapping the cerebral blood flow, and quantifying oxygen and glucose consumption to define these areas. The second decade revealed the mechanism of the neuronal cell death. As the Biochemical pathways were dissected penumbral science became a rapidly evolving area of molecular biology. The third decade of penumbral research found a transitional leap as using positron emission tomography (PET) scanning can identify brain tissue with decreased blood flow and magnetic resonance imaging (MRI) has the ability to detect portions of the ischemic tissue that has not yet died. These images have allowed vision into the brain to see the areas of tissue that may be salvaged, the penumbra.

1. Astrup J, Symon L, Branston NM, Lassen NA. Cortical evoked potential and extracellular K+ and H+ at critical levels of brain ischemia. Stroke. 1977 Jan-Feb;8(1):51-7. doi: 10.1161/01.str.8.1.51. PMID: 13521. 2. Astrup J, Siesjö BK, Symon L. Thresholds in cerebral ischemia - the ischemic penumbra. Stroke. 1981 Nov-Dec;12(6):723-5. doi: 10.1161/01.str.12.6.723. PMID: 6272455.
