= Real-time MRI =

Type of MRI

Real-time MRI of a human heart (2-chamber view) at 22 ms resolution

Real-time MRI of a vocal tract while singing, at 40 ms resolution

Real-time magnetic resonance imaging (RT-MRI) refers to the continuous monitoring of moving objects in real time. Traditionally, real-time MRI was possible only with low image quality or low temporal resolution. An iterative reconstruction algorithm removed limitations. Radial FLASH MRI (real-time) yields a temporal resolution of 20 to 30 milliseconds for images with an in-plane resolution of 1.5 to 2.0 mm. Real-time MRI adds information about diseases of the joints and the heart. In many cases MRI examinations become easier and more comfortable for patients, especially for the patients who cannot calm their breathing or who have arrhythmia.

Balanced steady-state free precession (bSSFP) imaging gives better image contrast between the blood pool and myocardium than FLASH MRI, at the cost of severe banding artifact when B0 inhomogeneity is strong.

== History ==
1977/1978 - Raymond Damadian built the first MRI scanner and achieved the first MRI scan of a healthy human body (1977) with the intent of diagnosing cancer. Additionally, Peter Mansfield develops the echo-planar technique, producing images in seconds and becoming the basis for fast MRIs.

1983 - Introduction of the k-space by D B Twieg

1987 - First real-time MRI of the heart is developed

1997 - Parallel imaging with an RF coil array is introduced by D K Sodickson

1999 - SENSE image reconstruction is introduced by K P Pruessmann

2002 - GRAPPA image reconstruction is introduced by Mark Griswold

== Physical basis ==
=== Overview ===
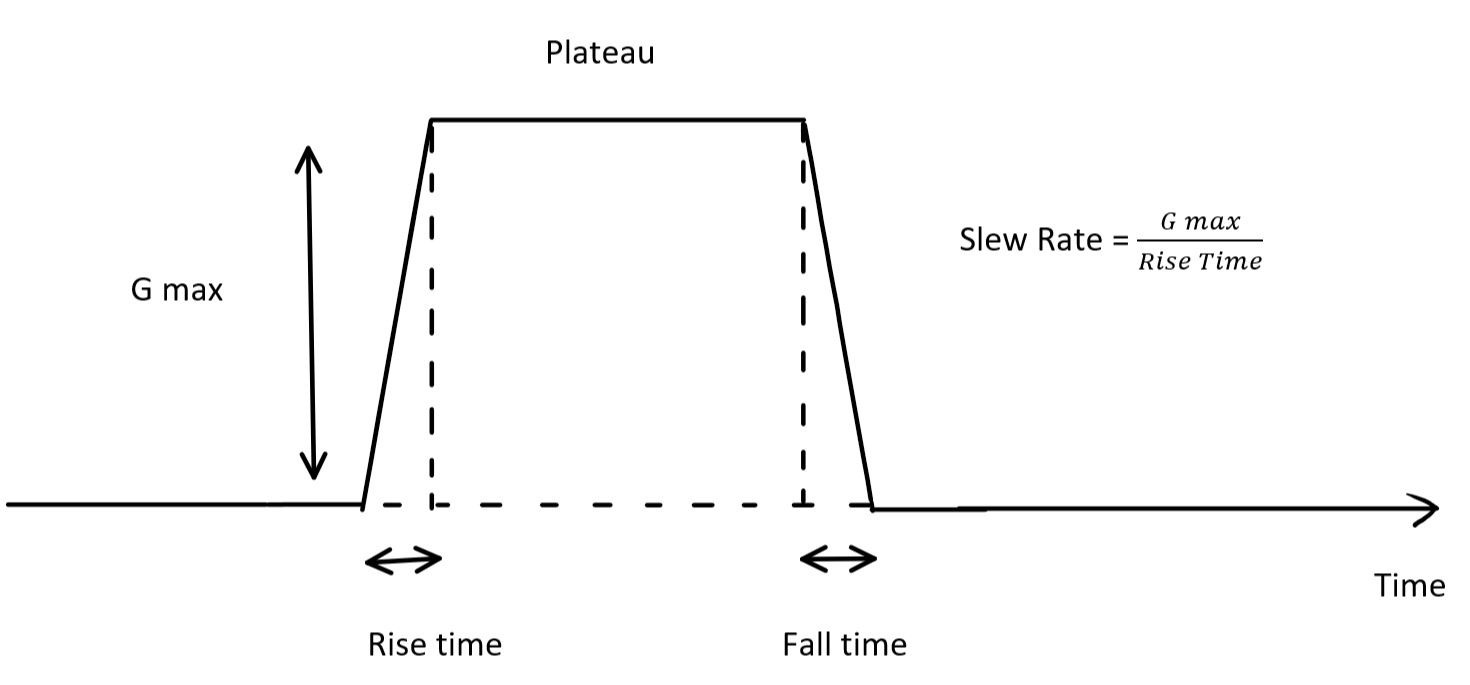
Equation for calculating the slew rate and accompanying diagram

In general, real time MRI relies on gradient echo sequences, efficient k-space sampling, and fast reconstruction methods to speed up the image acquisition process. Gradient echo sequences present shorter echo times since only one RF pulse is required for each sequence. Modern fast-switching gradient coils also require increasing the slew rate, allowing for faster changes in gradient echo sequences and decreasing the repetition time.

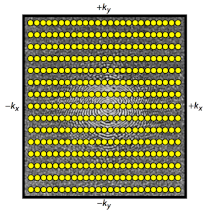
Rectilinear sampling of the k-space

=== k-space sampling ===
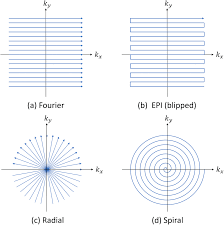
Other k-space sampling trajectories

Efficient k-space sampling also decreases data collection time. Rectilinear scanning has become the standard k-space sampling method for MRI. However, the process takes a relatively long time as it samples the entire k-space equally. Because of this delay, other sampling methods are used to capture real-time motion. Single shot echo planar imaging is one extremely fast sampling method in which all of the data for the MR image is collected from one RF pulse. However, the EPI method is still a Cartesian sampling method, like the rectilinear scan, equally sampling the entire k-space. Spiral sampling, like EPI, only requires a single RF pulse to sample the entire k-space. Radial and spiral sampling are also used as methods to efficiently sample the k-space, with spiral also only requiring a single RF pulse to sample the k-space. Both radial and spiral sampling are more efficient than the Cartesian methods because they oversample low frequencies, which allows for general motion capture and better real-time image reconstruction. Thus, radial or spiral sampling of the k-space are now the preferred methods for real-time MRI reconstruction.

=== Parallel imaging ===
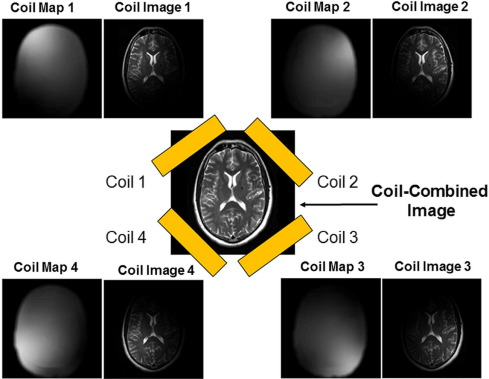
Parallel imaging coil collection

Parallel imaging involves the addition of multiple coils surrounding the target with each coil acquiring a fraction of the total image. Because modern GPUs have parallel processing capabilities, they can reconstruct each portion of the image simultaneously. Therefore, the more coils used, the faster the acquisition of the MR images.

=== Gradient-echo sequences ===
==== FLASH MRI ====
While early applications were based on echo planar imaging, which found an important application in real-time functional MRI (rt-fMRI), recent progress is based on iterative reconstruction and FLASH MRI. The real-time imaging method proposed by Uecker and colleagues combines radial FLASH MRI, which offers rapid and continuous data acquisition, motion robustness, and tolerance to undersampling, with an iterative image reconstruction method based on the formulation of image reconstruction as a nonlinear inverse problem. By integrating the data from multiple receive coils (i.e. parallel MRI) and exploiting the redundancy in the time series of images with the use of regularization and filtering, this approach enhances the possible degree of data undersampling by one order of magnitude, so that high-quality images may be obtained out of as little as 5 to 10% of the data required for a normal image reconstruction.

Because of the very short echo times (e.g., 1 to 2 milliseconds), the method does not suffer from off-resonance effects, so that the images neither exhibit susceptibility artifacts nor rely on fat suppression. While spoiled FLASH sequences offer spin density or T1 contrast, versions with refocused or fully balanced gradients provide access to T2/T1 contrast. The choice of the gradient-echo time (e.g., in-phase vs opposed-phase conditions) further alters the representation of water and fat signals in the images and will allow for separate water/fat movies.

==== Balanced steady state free precession ====
Another GRE sequence commonly used in RT-MRI is balanced steady state free precession (bSSFP), as mentioned above with balanced gradients. Steady state free precession involves a repetition time (TR) that is shorter than T2. This prevents the magnetic signal from decaying completely before the next RF pulse is applied, which then establishes a steady state signal over time. The short TR also makes bSSFP ideal for RT-MRI.

The equation for peak MR signal in bSSFP is given as:

$M_{ss,xy}\vert_{\alpha=\alpha_{opt}} = \frac{1}{2}M_0\sqrt{\frac{1-E_1^2}{1-E_2^2}} \approx \frac{1}{2}M_0\sqrt{\frac{T_2}{T_1}}$

Where $M_0$ is the initial magnetization, $E_1 = e^{-T_1/T_R}$ and $E_2 = e^{-T_2/T_R}$.

Thus, the MR signal is proportional to T2/T1. Materials with similar T1 and T2, such as fluids and fat, present high T2/T1 contrast and can have signal intensity up to $0.5M_0$.

The bSSFP signal is also greater than the FLASH signal by a factor of

$\frac{1}{\sqrt{1-E_2^2}}$.

Due to this strong fluid/tissue contrast, RT-MRI with bSSFP lends itself to cardiac imaging and visualizing blood flow.

=== Image reconstruction ===
==== SENSitivity Encoding (SENSE) ====
Certain image reconstruction algorithms used alongside parallel imaging address the potential issues that can arise from undersampling the k-space. SENSitivity Encoding (SENSE) is a method that reconstructs the partial k-space data from each coil and combines the partial images into the final scan in the spatial domain. Coil sensitivities must first be acquired either before the actual imaging or during the imaging process. During the rest of imaging, the k-space is undersampled to skip every other line, resulting in a one-half field of view.

As a two-point example, pixels on the original aliased images can be "unfolded" through the following equations to give the final scan:

$P_1 = A\cdot S_{1A} + B\cdot S_{1B}$

$P_2 = A\cdot S_{2A} + B\cdot S_{2B}$

for two points, $A$ and $B$, in the final image. $P_1$ and $P_2$ denote the image signal for the aliased image. $S_{1A}$ and $S_{1B}$ are the sensitivity values for coil 1 at points $A$ and $B$, respectively, and $S_{2A}$and $S_{2B}$are the sensitivity values for coil 2 at points $A$ and $B$, respectively.

==== GeneRalized Autocalibrating Partial Parallel Acquisition (GRAPPA) ====
Another reconstruction algorithm used is GeneRalized Autocalibrating Partial Parallel Acquisition (GRAPPA). GRAPPA fills in the undersampled k-space data in the k-space domain before reconstructing the final image. Lines through the center of the k-space are fully sampled, typically alongside the actual image, to give the autocalibration signal (ACS) region. Weighing factors are calculated using the ACS, and these factors reflect the coil-specific distortions that each coil applies on the full field-of-view frequency domain. Then, the filled-in k-space data undergoes the inverse Fourier transform to construct the partial, non-aliased images. These images are then simply combined directly in the spatial domain.

If the k-space data is non-Cartesian, reconstruction is computationally more difficult, since the fast Fourier transform (FFT) requires Cartesian values. Typically, k-space data must be resampled into Cartesian coordinates before applying the FFT. GRAPPA can address these issues by obtaining large quantities of calibration data; however, the fastest reconstructions will generally require Cartesian data.

=== Signal-to-noise ratio ===
Lastly, within parallel image reconstruction there is another factor to consider, which is the signal to noise ratio (SNR). The SNR for parallel imaging can be calculated using the following equation:

$SNR_{parallel} = \frac{SNR_{MRI}}{g\sqrt{R}}$

Where $R$ is the acceleration factor and $g$ is the spatially dependent geometry factor (proportional to the number of coils used or the interactions between coils). Therefore, the more coils used, the faster the imaging process and the more inter-coil interactions; hence, the lower the SNR.

== Applications ==
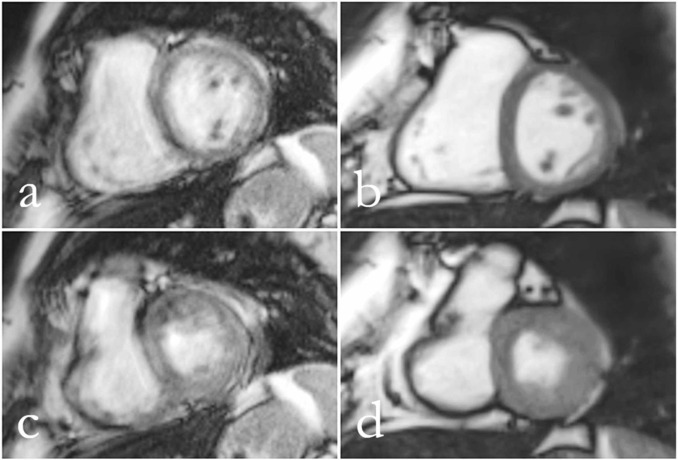
(a,c) CINE and (b,d) RT CMR at 1.5 T of a patient with atrial fibrillation in a mid-ventricular SA view during end-diastole (a,b) and end-systole (c,d). CINE mages have reduced diagnostic quality (score 1), while RT images present with good diagnostic quality.

=== Cardiac MRI ===
Although applications of real-time MRI cover a broad spectrum ranging from non-medical studies of turbulent flow to the noninvasive monitoring of interventional (surgical) procedures, the most important application making use of the new capabilities is cardiovascular imaging. Previous cardiac MR (CMR) used cine techniques to capture the periodic motion of the heart. However, this is not feasible for patients with arrhythmia, where the cardiac cycle is unpredictable. With the new method it is possible to obtain movies of the beating heart in real time with up to 50 frames per second during free breathing and without the need for a synchronization to the electrocardiogram. A study performed by Laubrock et al. demonstrated that RT-MRI produced higher quality images with a higher SNR than cine CMR with a bSSFP sequence and radial k-space sampling. RT-MRI also removes the need for breath-holding while imaging, leading to a more comfortable experience for the patient as well.

=== Musculoskeletal MRI ===
Apart from cardiac MRI other real-time applications deal with functional studies of joint kinetics (e.g., temporomandibular joint, knee and the wrist) or address the coordinated dynamics of the articulators such as lips, tongue, soft palate and vocal folds during speaking (articulatory phonetics) or swallowing. Musculoskeletal imaging in particular benefits from real-time observation. Researchers at the NYU Grossman School of Medicine developed a RT-MRI glove for imaging movement of the hand. The glove uses high impedance coils to prevent the generation of eddy currents from rapidly changing magnetic fields and bSSFP for rapid imaging times. High-impedance coils remove the need for specific coil conformations and active gradient shielding.

=== MRI-guided invasive procedures ===
Applications in interventional MRI, which refers to the monitoring of minimally invasive surgical procedures, are possible by interactively changing parameters such as image position and orientation. This application is particularly helpful when a 3D image of the tissue is needed during surgery. It requires an in-room display for the physician to use during the procedure as well as the use of MRI-safe surgical tools. These include ceramic, plastic, or titanium, which is a paramagnetic metal. By using bSSFP and parallel imaging with multiple coils, frame rates of 5-10 frames per second have been accomplished, allowing for the visualization of cardiac procedures.

An MRI linear accelerator (LINAC) can image tumors and organs on-table. MRI-guided radiotherapy (MRgRT) is limited due to high costs and the personnel costs needed for each treatment and because clinical benefit compared to conventional radiotherapy platforms has not been established.

== Future directions ==
=== Parallel imaging ===
Parallel imaging coils are available for torso and cardiac imaging, but they are not yet standardized for other body parts. Dynamic coil setups for speech and musculoskeletal imaging are key areas for current research.

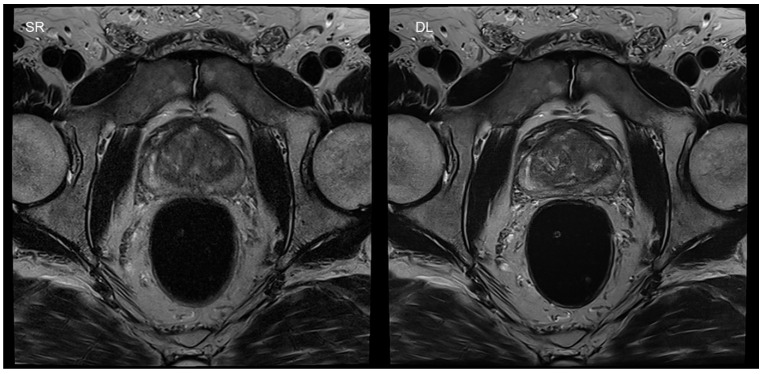
Standard reconstruction (left) versus reconstruction with DL (right) for a T2-weighted turbo spin-echo scan of the prostate

=== Machine learning ===
Image reconstruction in RT-MRI benefits from machine learning (ML) or deep learning (DL). A nonlinear kernel, or mapping function, can be developed from the ACS to fill in k-space data and generate the final image. This process as a whole significantly accelerates the MRI process. Image segmentation or identification of lesions can be achieved through machine learning. In deep learning, with a convolutional neural network, the mapping function can be specified by the network. ML and DL improve image resolution as well as imaging speed.

==== Movienet ====
Movienet is a deep learning method for fast reconstruction of motion-resolved four-dimensional (4D) MRI. It was developed at Memorial Sloan Kettering Cancer Center. It was published online in 2023 and in print in Magnetic Resonance in Medicine in 2024. Many deep learning MRI reconstruction methods are "unrolled" networks that repeatedly enforce consistency with the acquired k-space data. Movienet works differently: it runs entirely in the image domain. It uses correlations across space, time and receiver coils to remove the undersampling artifacts of golden-angle radial acquisitions. Because it skips iterative k-space data-consistency steps, reconstruction is much faster than with iterative compressed sensing methods such as XD-GRASP. This makes the method relevant to time-critical uses such as MRI-guided radiation therapy.

===== Subsequent work =====
Real-time imaging on MR-Linac systems. Movienet has been built into MR signature matching (MRSIGMA), a real-time volumetric imaging technique for MR-Linac systems. In MRSIGMA, Movienet produces a 4D motion dictionary before treatment. During treatment, incoming data are matched to this dictionary by correlation analysis. On a 1.5 T MR-Linac, this enabled free-breathing volumetric imaging with an imaging latency below 200 ms. A later version, MRSIGMA with adaptive motion learning, uses Movienet to update the dictionary quickly. This makes real-time 3D imaging robust to drifts in the respiratory motion baseline.

High-resolution 4D MRI. HD-Movienet extends the method to 3D radial "kooshball" acquisitions. It enables motion-resolved volumetric MRI with 1.1 mm isotropic resolution and scan times under five minutes, without explicit k-space data consistency or calculation of coil sensitivities.

Auto-navigation and clinical use. RANGR is a deep learning technique that estimates respiratory motion directly from free-breathing golden-angle radial data ("auto-navigation"). Combined with Movienet, it forms a fully deep learning pipeline for motion-resolved MRI. This approach was used in a clinical prototype for free-breathing abdominal T1-weighted imaging, with about 1 minute of scanning for 3D MRI and 2.25 minutes for 4D MRI. For this prototype, Movienet was retrained to produce 320 × 320 images, the matrix size used in clinical practice.

Dynamic contrast-enhanced MRI. A Movienet-based network has been developed for dynamic contrast-enhanced (DCE) MRI. It was combined with a second network that estimates pharmacokinetic parameters, giving an end-to-end pipeline for reconstruction and quantification.

Self-supervised learning. Movienet is trained with supervision: it needs fully reconstructed reference images. SELFIE is a self-supervised method for dynamic golden-angle radial MRI that needs no such references. It was reported to give image quality comparable to both Movienet and XD-GRASP.

=== High-performance, low-field scanners ===
High-performance, low-field MRI scanners are also an area of development. These scanners operate at relatively low magnetic field strengths, such as 0.35 T or 0.55 T. Many RT-MRI acquisition sequences, such as bSSFP, experience significant off-resonance effects. Off-resonance effects increase linearly with B0 field strength, so minimizing B0 also minimizes these effects that can lead to artifacts and image distortion. This allows for longer TRs, which then opens the door for a wider range of k-space sampling methods and sequence designs. Finally, lower strength MRI scanners will reduce the dangers associated with heating of metallic implants and decrease the cost of MRI.
