= Gradient echo =

Type of MRI sequence

Gradient echo is a magnetic resonance imaging (MRI) sequence that has wide variety of applications, from magnetic resonance angiography to perfusion MRI and diffusion MRI. Rapid imaging acquisition allows it to be applied to 2D and 3D MRI imaging. Gradient echo uses magnetic gradients to generate a signal, instead of using 180 degrees radiofrequency pulse like spin echo; thus leading to faster image acquisition time.

== Mechanism ==
Unlike spin-echo sequence, a gradient echo sequence does not use a 180 degrees RF pulse to make the spins of particles coherent. Instead, the gradient echo uses magnetic gradients to manipulate the spins, allowing the spins to dephase and rephase when required. After an excitation pulse (usually less than 90 degrees), the spins are dephased after a period of time (due to free induction decay) and also by applying a reversed magnetic gradient to decay the spins. No signal is produced because the spins are not coherent. When the spins are rephased via a magnetic gradient, they become coherent, and thus signal (or "echo") is generated to form images. Unlike spin echo, gradient echo does not need to wait for transverse magnetisation to decay completely before initiating another sequence, thus it requires very short repetition times (TR), and therefore to acquire images in a short time.

After echo is formed, some transverse magnetisations remains because of short TR. Manipulating gradients during this time will produce images with different contrast. There are three main methods of manipulating contrast at this stage, namely steady-state free-precession (SSFP) that does not spoil the remaining transverse magnetisation, but attempts to recover them in subsequent RF pulses (thus producing T2-weighted images); the sequence with spoiler gradient that averages the transverse magnetisations in subsequent RF pulses by rotating residual transverse magnetisation into longitudinal plane and longitudinal magnetisation into transverse planes (thus producing mixed T1 and T2-weighted images), and RF spoiler that vary the phases of RF pulse to eliminates the transverse magnetisation, thus producing pure T1-weighted images.

Gradient echo uses a flip angle smaller than 90 degrees, thus longitudinal magnetisation is not eliminated while flipping the spins. The larger the flip angle, the higher the T1 weighing of the tissue because more longitudinal magnetisation most recover to produce a difference in signals between the tissues.

== Steady-state free precession ==
Steady-state free precession imaging (SSFP) or balanced SSFP is an MRI technique which uses short repetition times (TR) and low flip angles (about 10 degrees) to achieve steady state of longitudinal magnetizations as the magnetizations does not decay completely nor achieving full T1 relaxation. While spoiled gradient-echo sequences refer to a steady state of the longitudinal magnetization only, SSFP gradient-echo sequences include transverse coherences (magnetizations) from overlapping multi-order spin echoes and stimulated echoes. This is usually accomplished by refocusing the phase-encoding gradient in each repetition interval in order to keep the phase integral (or gradient moment) constant. Fully balanced SSFP MRI sequences achieve a phase of zero by refocusing all imaging gradients.

MP-RAGE (magnetization-prepared rapid acquisition with gradient echo) improves images of multiple sclerosis cortical lesions.

== Spoiling ==
At the end of the reading, the residual transverse magnetization can be terminated (through the application of suitable gradients and the excitation through pulses with a variable phase radiofrequency) or maintained.

In the first case there is a spoiled sequence, such as the fast low-angle shot MRI (FLASH MRI) sequence, while in the second case there are steady-state free precession imaging (SSFP) sequences.

== In-phase and out-of-phase ==
In-phase (IP) and out-of-phase (OOP) sequences correspond to paired gradient echo sequences using the same repetition time (TR) but with two different echo times (TE). This can detect even microscopic amounts of fat, which has a drop in signal on OOP compared to IP. Among renal tumors that do not show macroscopic fat, such a signal drop is seen in 80% of the clear cell type of renal cell carcinoma as well as in minimal fat angiomyolipoma.

== Effective T_{2} (T_{2}* or "T2-star") ==
T_{2}*-weighted imaging can be created as a postexcitation refocused gradient echo sequence with small flip angle. The sequence of a GRE T_{2}*WI requires high uniformity of the magnetic field.

== Commercial names of gradient echo sequences ==
Academic Classification	Spoiled gradient echo		Steady-State Free Precession (SSFP)		Balanced Steady-State Free Precession (bSSFP)
Academic Classification	Ordinary type	Turbo type (Magnetization preparation, extremely low angle shot, short TR)	FID-like	Echo-like	Balanced Steady-State Free Precession (bSSFP)
Siemens	FLASH; Fast Imaging using Low Angle Shot	TurboFLASH; Turbo FLASH	FISP; Fast Imaging with Steady-state Precession	PSIF; Reversed FISP	TrueFISP; True FISP
GE	SPGR; Spoiled GRASS	FastSPGR; Fast SPGR	GRASS; Gradiant Recall Acquisition using Steady States	SSFP; Steady State Free Precession	FIESTA; Fast Imaging Employing Steady-state Acquisition
Philips	T_{1} FFE; T_{1}-weighted Fast Field Echo	TFE; Turbo Field Echo	FFE; Fast Field Echo	T_{2}-FFE; T_{2}-weighted Fast Field Echo	b-FFE; Balanced Fast Field Echo

VIBE (volumetric interpolated breath-hold examination) is an MRI sequence that produces T1-weighted gradient echo images in three-dimensions (3D). Apart from lower fluid signal intensity than a typical T1-weighted image, other appearances of VIBE images is similar to a typical T1-weighted image. Since its acquisition is only 30 seconds, suitable for breath-holding, it is used in breast and abdominal imaging to obtain high-resolution images minimising respiratory movement artifacts. VIBE images have low contrast in soft tissues and cartilage but have high contrast between the bony cortex and bone marrow. Bony lesions such as callus and fibrous tissue can also be readily distinguished from surrounding cortical bone because high contrast between the bone lesions and the bony cortex.
