= Jens Frahm =

German physicist (born 1951)

Jens Frahm (born 29 March 1951 in Oldenburg, Germany) is a German biophysicist and physicochemist. He is Research Group Leader (retired since 2026) of the Biomedical NMR group at the Max Planck Institute (MPI) for Multidisciplinary Sciences in Göttingen, Germany (prior to January 1, 2022, at the former MPI for Biophysical Chemistry).

== Early life and education ==
From 1969 to 1974 Frahm studied physics at the University of Göttingen. His PhD thesis under the guidance of Hans Strehlow at the MPI for Biophysical Chemistry was devoted to the use of nuclear magnetic resonance (NMR) spectroscopy for a characterization of the molecular dynamics of hydrated ions in complex solutions. He received his PhD degree in 1977 in physical chemistry.

== Career ==
=== Early ===
Working as a research assistant at the Göttingen MPI since 1977 Frahm formed an independent research team which focused on the new possibilities offered by spatially resolved NMR and magnetic resonance imaging (MRI) – discovered in 1974, by Paul Lauterbur and Peter Mansfield.

=== Biomedical NMR ===
In 1982 the Biomedical NMR group was formally founded and from 1984 to 1992 primarily financed via two substantial grants from the Ministry for Research and Technology of the German Federal Government. The primary aim of the projects was a more sophisticated development of the rather modest MRI techniques available in the early eighties – mainly with respect to speed and specificity. Already in 1985 the group presented a major breakthrough for the future development of MRI in both science and medicine. The invention of a rapid imaging principle, the FLASH MRI (fast low angle shot) technique, allowed for a 100-fold reduction of the measuring times of cross-sectional and three-dimensional images. The FLASH acquisition technique led the ground for many modern MRI applications in diagnostic imaging. Examples include breathhold imaging of the abdomen, electrocardiogram-synchronized quasi-real time movies of the beating heart, dynamic scanning of contrast media uptake, 3D imaging of complex anatomic structures such as the brain that allow for unprecedented high spatial resolution and arbitrary view angles, and magnetic resonance angiography (MRA) of the vasculature. Other achievements extended to MRI and localized magnetic resonance spectroscopy (MRS) techniques based on stimulated echoes – another invention from 1984.

Royalties from the group's patents served to fully support all activities of the Biomedizinische NMR Forschungs GmbH (not-for-profit) which was founded in 1993 as an independent research unit associated with the Göttingen MPI. In 1997 Frahm became adjunct professor at the Faculty for Chemistry of the Georg-August-University in Göttingen and in 2011 External Member of the Max Planck Institute for Dynamics and Self-Organization. From 2019 until 2025 Frahm continued his research at the Max-Planck-Institut für biophysikalische Chemie (now: Maz Planck Institute for Multidisciplinary Sciences) as Emeritus Director heading a focused research group working on the further technical development and clinical translation of real-time MRI methods and their derivatives.

Central to the research of Frahm is the further methodologic development of MRI and localized magnetic resonance spectroscopy (MRS) in conjunction with advanced applications in neurobiology (brain research) and cardiovascular research. The interdisciplinary team aims at innovative noninvasive approaches to study the central nervous system of humans and animals – from insects to primates with a special emphasis on mouse models of human brain disorders. Using several high-field MRI systems, current possibilities include structural, metabolic, and functional assessments of the intact living brain. Techniques range from high-resolution 3D MRI studies of brain morphology and localized proton MRS of brain metabolism to fiber tractography of the axonal connectivity via diffusion tensor imaging and mapping of the functional architecture of cortical networks by functional MRI.

Recent methodologic projects focussed on the use of iterative image reconstruction techniques for non-cartesian MRI (e.g., undersampled radial MRI) and parallel MRI that define the reconstruction process as a nonlinear inverse problem. Other developments address the possibility of real-time MRI in order to overcome the motion sensitivity of conventional MRI acquisitions and to monitor organ movements in real time. Most recent achievements in real-time MRI are based on FLASH techniques with highly undersampled radial data encodings. When combined with image reconstruction by nonlinear inversion with temporal regularization, they allow for movies of the human heart with image acquisition times as short as 10 to 30 milliseconds, which correspond to MRI movies with up to 100 frames per second. Such real-time movies may continuously be recorded during free breathing, without ECG synchronization, and without motion artifacts. Apart from cardiac applications and quantitative measurements of blood flow in real time, novel possibilities range from studies of joint movements, bowel motility and swallowing mechanics (e.g., dysphagia and reflux disorders) to speech generation and brass playing. Interactive real-time MRI will also revitalize "interventional" MRI which refers to MRI monitoring of minimally invasive procedures. A selection of example MRI videos can be found here: Biomedizinische NMR. The development of a high-quality and robust real-time MRI technique must be considered another breakthrough in MRI that promises to shape its future. Real-time MRI will again broaden the diagnostic potential of MRI by adding completely new, hitherto impossible scientific and clinical applications as well as by simplifying and shortening existing procedures.

Furthermore, the algorithm for regularized nonlinear inversion (NLINV) could be extended to allow for model-based reconstructions of quantitative parametric maps directly from suitable sets of MRI raw data. Relevant physical or physiological parameters are, for example, T1 relaxation times of water protons in various body tissues and the velocities of blood flow or cerebrospinal fluid (CSF) flow. These novel approaches include a corresponding signal model into the MRI signal equation and therefore always pose a nonlinear inverse reconstruction problem. However, as already demonstrated for real-time MRI, the computational demand is met by a user-invisible GPU-based bypass computer which may be retrofitted to an existing MRI system. The results offer fundamental advantages in comparison to conventional mapping methods which are based on serial image reconstructions followed by pixelwise fitting.

== Awards ==
- 1989 European MRI Award, German Roentgen Society
- 1990 European Magnetic Resonance Award, European Workshop on NMR in Medicine
- 1991 Gold Medal Award, International Society of Magnetic Resonance in Medicine
- 1992 Hans-Meyer-Award, Roentgen Society of Lower Saxony
- 1993 Karl-Heinz-Beckurts-Award, Beckurts-Foundation
- 1996 Niedersachsenpreis, President of the State of Lower Saxony
- 2005 Research Award of the Sobek-Foundation
- 2006 Biomedizinische NMR Forschungs GmbH
- 2013 Science Award (Stifterverband Award) of the Donors' Association for the Promotion of the Sciences and Humanities
- 2015 Niedersachsenprofessur 2016–2019
- 2016 Hall of Fame of German Research
- 2017 Jacob-Henle-Medal 2016
- 2018 European Inventor Award in Research category for "Improved magnetic resonance imaging (MRI)" especially in Fast low angle shot magnetic resonance imaging (FLASH MRI).
- 2020 Werner von Siemens Ring
- 2025 Commander's Cross of the Order of Merit of the Federal Republic of Germany
- 2025 Gold Medal Aureus Gottingensis, University of Göttingen

=== Memberships ===
- 1995 Fellow of the Society of Magnetic Resonance in Medicine
- 2005 Akademie der Wissenschaften zu Göttingen
- 2020 acatech (German Academy for Technical Sciences)
