= Dieter Matthaei =

German radiotherapist and internist

Dieter Matthaei (born 1 February 1949 in Clausthal-Zellerfeld, Germany) is a German radiotherapist and internist.

Matthaei studied physics and medicine at the universities of Berlin and Göttingen. In 1977, he received his doctorate from the University of Göttingen. He was from 1983 to 1987 a research associate at the Max-Planck-Institut für biophysikalische Chemie in Göttingen and is now medical specialist for internal medicine in Göttingen.

Matthaei worked at the University of Göttingen and at the Max Planck Institute for Nuclear magnetic resonance in biological systems. He was looking for a scientific development of NMR techniques based on magnetic resonance imagery. With Axel Haase and Jens Frahm he succeeded in 1985 with the invention of rapid image proceedings FLASH MRI (fast low angle shot) a revolutionary breakthrough that allows the use of MRI imaging for clinical diagnosis. It enabled the first real coherent representation of body functions.

He is the founder and editor of Magnetic Resonance Materials in Physics, Biology and Medicine (MAGMA).

== Sources ==
- Matthaei, Dieter; Frahm, Jens; Haase, Axel; Hanicke, Wolfgang (1985). "Regional Physiological Functions Depicted by Sequences of Rapid Magnetic Resonance Images". The Lancet. 326 (8460). Elsevier BV: 893. doi:10.1016/s0140-6736(85)90158-8. ISSN 0140-6736. PMID 2864605.
- Matthaei, D; Haase, A; Frahm, J; Schuster, R; Bomsdorf, H (1985). "Chemical-Shift-Selective Magnetic-Resonance Imaging of Avascular Necrosis of the Femoral Head". The Lancet. 325 (8425). Elsevier BV: 370–371. doi:10.1016/s0140-6736(85)91388-1. ISSN 0140-6736. PMID 2857422.
- Haase, A; Frahm, J; Matthaei, D; Hanicke, W; Merboldt, K.-D (1986). "FLASH imaging. Rapid NMR imaging using low flip-angle pulses". Journal of Magnetic Resonance. 67 (2). Elsevier BV: 258–266. Bibcode:1986JMagR..67..258H. doi:10.1016/0022-2364(86)90433-6. ISSN 0022-2364. (first scientific publication of FLASH)
- Frahm J, Haase A, Hänicke W, Merboldt KD, Matthaei D. Hochfrequenz-Impuls und Gradienten-Impuls-Verfahren zur Aufnahme von schnellen NMR-Tomogrammen unter Benutzung von Gradientenechos. Deutsche Patentanmeldung P 35 04 734.8 vom 12. Februar 1985
- Frahm, Jens; Haase, Axel; Matthaei, Dieter (1986). "Rapid Three-Dimensional MR Imaging Using the FLASH Technique". Journal of Computer Assisted Tomography. 10 (2). Ovid Technologies (Wolters Kluwer Health): 363–368. doi:10.1097/00004728-198603000-00046. ISSN 0363-8715. PMID 3950172.
- Frahm, Jens; Haase, Axel; Matthaei, Dieter (1986). "Rapid NMR imaging of dynamic processes using the FLASII technique". Magnetic Resonance in Medicine. 3 (2). Wiley: 321–327. doi:10.1002/mrm.1910030217. ISSN 0740-3194. PMID 3713496.
