= Fast low angle shot magnetic resonance imaging =

Pulse sequence used in medical imaging

Fast low angle shot magnetic resonance imaging (FLASH MRI) is a particular sequence of magnetic resonance imaging. It is a gradient echo sequence which combines a low-flip angle radio-frequency excitation of the nuclear magnetic resonance signal (recorded as a spatially encoded gradient echo) with a short repetition time. It is the generic form of steady-state free precession imaging.

Different manufacturers of MRI equipment use different names for this experiment. Siemens uses the name FLASH, General Electric used the name SPGR (Spoiled Gradient Echo), and Philips uses the name CE-FFE-T1 (Contrast-Enhanced Fast Field Echo) or T1-FFE.

Depending on the desired contrast, the generic FLASH technique provides spoiled versions that destroy transverse coherences and yield T1 contrast as well as refocused versions (constant phase per repetition) and fully balanced versions (zero phase per repetition) that incorporate transverse coherences into the steady-state signal and offer T1/T2 contrast.

== Physical basis ==
The physical basis of MRI is the spatial encoding of the nuclear magnetic resonance (NMR) signal obtainable from water protons (i.e. hydrogen nuclei) in biologic tissue. In terms of MRI, signals with different spatial encodings that are required for the reconstruction of a full image need to be acquired by generating multiple signals – usually in a repetitive way using multiple radio-frequency excitations.

The generic FLASH technique emerges as a gradient echo sequence which combines a low-flip angle radio-frequency excitation of the NMR signal (recorded as a spatially encoded gradient echo) with a rapid repetition of the basic sequence. The repetition time is usually much shorter than the typical T1 relaxation time of the protons in biologic tissue. Only the combination of (i) a low-flip angle excitation which leaves unused longitudinal magnetization for an immediate next excitation with (ii) the acquisition of a gradient echo which does not need a further radio-frequency pulse that would affect the residual longitudinal magnetization, allows for the rapid repetition of the basic sequence interval and the resulting speed of the entire image acquisition. In fact, the FLASH sequence eliminated all waiting periods previously included to accommodate effects from T1 saturation. FLASH reduced the typical sequence interval to what is minimally required for imaging: a slice-selective radio-frequency pulse and gradient, a phase-encoding gradient, and a (reversed) frequency-encoding gradient generating the echo for data acquisition.

For radial data sampling, the phase- and frequency-encoding gradients are replaced by two simultaneously applied frequency-encoding gradients that rotate the Fourier lines in data space. In either case, repetition times are as short as 2 to 10 milliseconds, so that the use of 64 to 256 repetitions results in image acquisition times of about 0.1 to 2.5 seconds for a two-dimensional image. Most recently, highly undersampled radial FLASH MRI acquisitions have been combined with an iterative image reconstruction by regularized nonlinear inversion to achieve real-time MRI at a temporal resolution of 20 to 30 milliseconds for images with a spatial resolution of 1.5 to 2.0 millimeters. This method allows for a visualization of the beating heart in real time – without synchronization to the electrocardiogram and during free breathing.

== Applications ==
Applications can include:

- cross-sectional images with acquisition times of a few seconds enable MRI studies of the thorax and abdomen within a single breathhold,
- dynamic acquisitions synchronized to the electrocardiogram generate movies of the beating heart,
- sequential acquisitions monitor physiological processes such as the differential uptake of contrast media into body tissues,
- three-dimensional acquisitions visualize complex anatomic structures (brain, joints) at unprecedented high spatial resolution in all three dimensions and along arbitrary view directions, and
- Magnetic resonance angiography (MRA) yields three-dimensional representations of the vasculature.

== History ==
FLASH MRI was invented in 1985 by Jens Frahm, Axel Haase, W Hänicke, KD Merboldt, and D Matthaei (German Patent Application P 35 04 734.8, 12 February 1985) at the Max-Planck-Institut für biophysikalische Chemie in Göttingen, Germany. The technique is revolutionary in shortening MRI measuring times by up to two orders of magnitude.

FLASH was very rapidly adopted commercially. RARE was slower, and echo-planar imaging (EPI) – for technical reasons – took even more time. Echo-planar imaging had been proposed by Mansfield's group in 1977, and the first crude images were shown by Mansfield and Ian Pykett in the same year. Roger Ordidge presented the first movie in 1981. Its breakthrough came with the invention of shielded gradients.

The introduction of FLASH MRI sequences in diagnostic imaging for the first time allowed for a drastic shortening of the measuring times without a substantial loss in image quality. In addition, the measuring principle led to a broad range of completely new imaging modalities.

In 2010, an extended FLASH method with highly undersampled radial data encoding and iterative image reconstruction achieved real-time MRI with a temporal resolution of 20 milliseconds (1/50th of a second). Taken together, this latest development corresponds to an acceleration by a factor of 10,000 compared to the MRI situation before 1985. In general, FLASH denoted a breakthrough in clinical MRI that stimulated further technical as well as scientific developments up to date.
