= Iterative reconstruction =

Image reconstruction algorithms

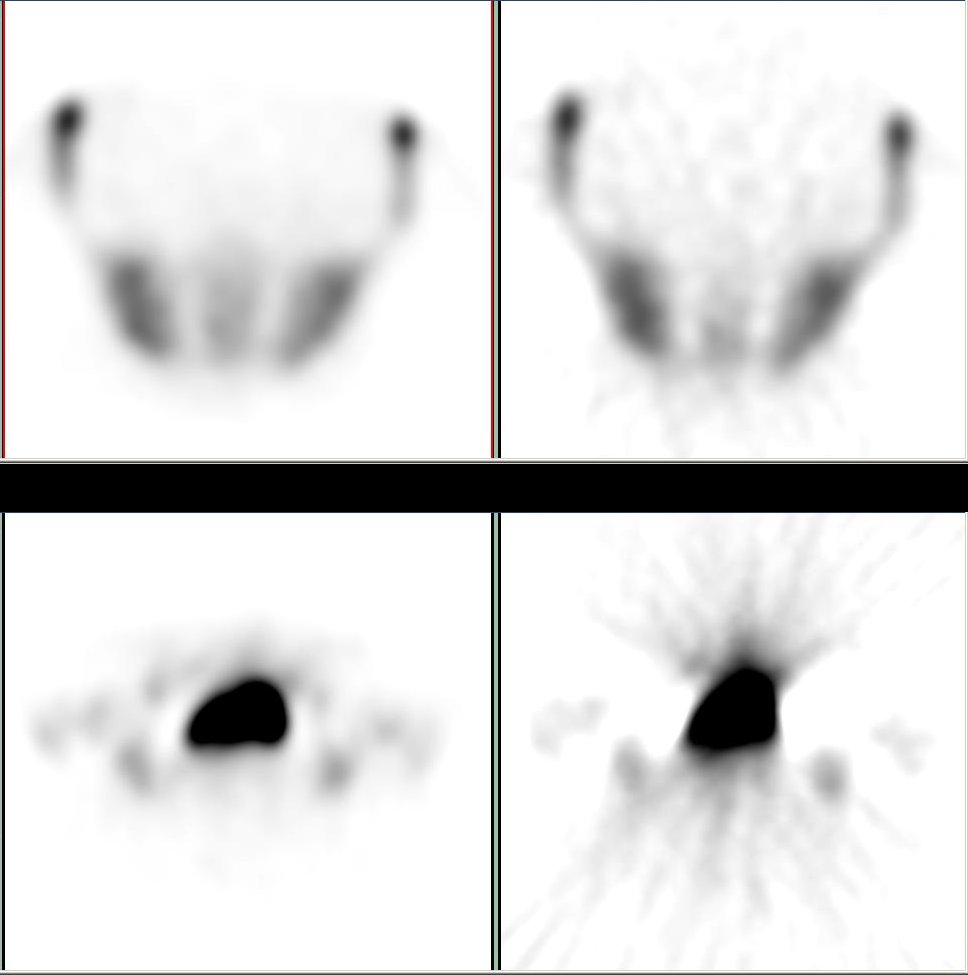
Example showing differences between filtered backprojection (right half) and iterative reconstruction method (left half)

Iterative reconstruction refers to iterative algorithms used to reconstruct 2D and 3D images in certain imaging techniques. For example, in computed tomography an image must be reconstructed from projections of an object. Here, iterative reconstruction techniques are usually a better, but computationally more expensive alternative to the common filtered back projection (FBP) method, which directly calculates the image in a single reconstruction step. In recent research works, scientists have shown that extremely fast computations and massive parallelism is possible for iterative reconstruction, which makes iterative reconstruction practical for commercialization.

== Basic concepts ==
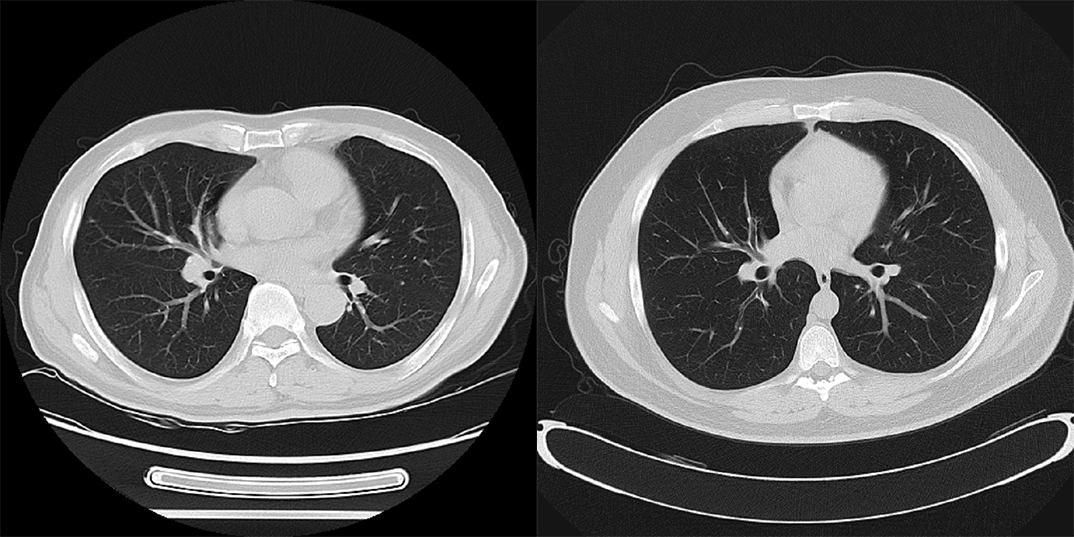
CT scan using iterative reconstruction (left) versus filtered backprojection (right)

The reconstruction of an image from the acquired data is an inverse problem. Often, it is not possible to exactly solve the inverse problem directly. In this case, a direct algorithm has to approximate the solution, which might cause visible reconstruction artifacts in the image. Iterative algorithms approach the correct solution using multiple iteration steps, which allows to obtain a better reconstruction at the cost of a higher computation time.

There are a large variety of algorithms, but each starts with an assumed image, computes projections from the image, compares the original projection data and updates the image based upon the difference between the calculated and the actual projections.

=== Algebraic reconstruction ===
The Algebraic Reconstruction Technique (ART) was the first iterative reconstruction technique used for computed tomography by Hounsfield.

=== Iterative Sparse Asymptotic Minimum Variance ===
The iterative sparse asymptotic minimum variance algorithm is an iterative, parameter-free superresolution tomographic reconstruction method inspired by compressed sensing, with applications in synthetic-aperture radar, computed tomography scan, and magnetic resonance imaging (MRI).

=== Statistical reconstruction ===
There are typically five components to statistical iterative image reconstruction algorithms, e.g.

1. An object model that expresses the unknown continuous-space function $f(r)$ that is to be reconstructed in terms of a finite series with unknown coefficients that must be estimated from the data.
2. A system model that relates the unknown object to the "ideal" measurements that would be recorded in the absence of measurement noise. Often this is a linear model of the form $\mathbf{A}x+\epsilon$, where $\epsilon$ represents the noise.
3. A statistical model that describes how the noisy measurements vary around their ideal values. Often Gaussian noise or Poisson statistics are assumed. Because Poisson statistics are closer to reality, it is more widely used.
4. A cost function that is to be minimized to estimate the image coefficient vector. Often this cost function includes some form of regularization. Sometimes the regularization is based on Markov random fields.
5. An algorithm, usually iterative, for minimizing the cost function, including some initial estimate of the image and some stopping criterion for terminating the iterations.

=== Learned Iterative Reconstruction ===
In learned iterative reconstruction, the updating algorithm is learned from training data using techniques from machine learning such as convolutional neural networks, while still incorporating the image formation model. This typically gives faster and higher quality reconstructions and has been applied to CT and MRI reconstruction.

== Advantages ==
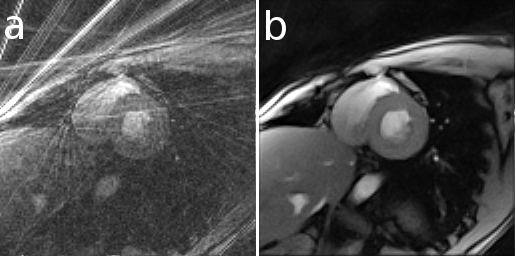
A single frame from a real-time MRI (rt-MRI) movie of a human heart. a) direct reconstruction b) iterative (nonlinear inverse) reconstruction

The advantages of the iterative approach include improved insensitivity to noise and capability of reconstructing an optimal image in the case of incomplete data. The method has been applied in emission tomography modalities like SPECT and PET, where there is significant attenuation along ray paths and noise statistics are relatively poor.

Statistical, likelihood-based approaches: Statistical, likelihood-based iterative expectation-maximization algorithms are now the preferred method of reconstruction. Such algorithms compute estimates of the likely distribution of annihilation events that led to the measured data, based on statistical principle, often providing better noise profiles and resistance to the streak artifacts common with FBP. Since the density of radioactive tracer is a function in a function space, therefore of extremely high-dimensions, methods which regularize the maximum-likelihood solution turning it towards penalized or maximum a-posteriori methods can have significant advantages for low counts. Examples such as Ulf Grenander's Sieve estimator or Bayes penalty methods, or via I.J. Good's roughness method may yield superior performance to expectation-maximization-based methods which involve a Poisson likelihood function only.

As another example, it is considered superior when one does not have a large set of projections available, when the projections are not distributed uniformly in angle, or when the projections are sparse or missing at certain orientations. These scenarios may occur in intraoperative CT, in cardiac CT, or when metal artifacts require the exclusion of some portions of the projection data.

In Magnetic Resonance Imaging it can be used to reconstruct images from data acquired with multiple receive coils and with sampling patterns different from the conventional Cartesian grid and allows the use of improved regularization techniques (e.g. total variation) or an extended modeling of physical processes to improve the reconstruction. For example, with iterative algorithms it is possible to reconstruct images from data acquired in a very short time as required for real-time MRI (rt-MRI).

In Cryo Electron Tomography, where the limited number of projections are acquired due to the hardware limitations and to avoid the biological specimen damage, it can be used along with compressive sensing techniques or regularization functions (e.g. Huber function) to improve the reconstruction for better interpretation.

Here is an example that illustrates the benefits of iterative image reconstruction for cardiac MRI, presented to the 7th International Conference on Functional Imaging and Modeling of the Heart, held at the Royal College of Obstetricians and Gynaecologists, in June 2013.

== See also ==
- Tomographic reconstruction
- Positron Emission Tomography
- Tomogram
- Computed Tomography
- Magnetic Resonance Imaging
- Inverse problem
- Osem
- Deconvolution
- Inpainting
- Algebraic Reconstruction Technique
- iterative Sparse Asymptotic Minimum Variance
