= Carlo Burton =

Carlo Burton SAG/DGA
- Other name: Charles Evans Jr.

Carlo Burton (aka Charles Evans Jr.) is a film producer, director, actor, screenwriter, and cinematographer. He is a member of the Screen Actors Guild, the Directors Guild of America and a signatory producer at both Guilds.

== Career ==
In 1992, Burton bought the rights to the life story of "Glasnost Gangster" Andrey Kuznetzov who was murdered eight months earlier in Los Angeles . Subsequently, Evans was repped by ICM from April 22, 1992, to April 22, 1994, in a one project producer/writer deal concerning the life of Andrey Kuznetsov and "the infiltration by ex-KGB'ers into the U.S. mob scene."

Burton directed and financed a film called Portrait of Eve written by Arthur V. Lowen. Burton also produced a film called The Trophy, Acting by Elie Travis of Dead Air. Burton also produces/directs documentaries. Featured in the New Mexico Film Festival, Space Travelers "focuses on legendary aerospace pioneer and designer Burt Rutan as he tries to take space flight into the next generation. Star Trek actor George Takei narrates."

== Film history ==
=== Producer ===
- 2018 Carlo Burton on the Ancient Roman Road to Switzerland (documentary) (Producer)
- 2016 Nobel Prize Winner Roger Guillemin (documentary) (Producer)
- 2016 Nobel Prize Winner Kary Mullis (documentary) (producer)
- 2015 Nobel Prize Winner Sherwood Rowland (documentary) (producer)
- 2013 Romains (documentary) (producer)
- 2012 Underground (documentary) (producer)
- 2012 Samba Parade in Humboldt CO (documentary) (producer)
- 2010 Chaos to Harmony (documentary) (executive producer, producer)
- 2010 Virgin Sex Myth: False and Disastrous Cure of AIDS (documentary) (producer)
- 2008 South Africa, Aids, Rape and Women's Rights (documentary) (executive producer, producer)
- 2009 Science + Dharma = Social Responsibility (documentary) (executive producer, producer)

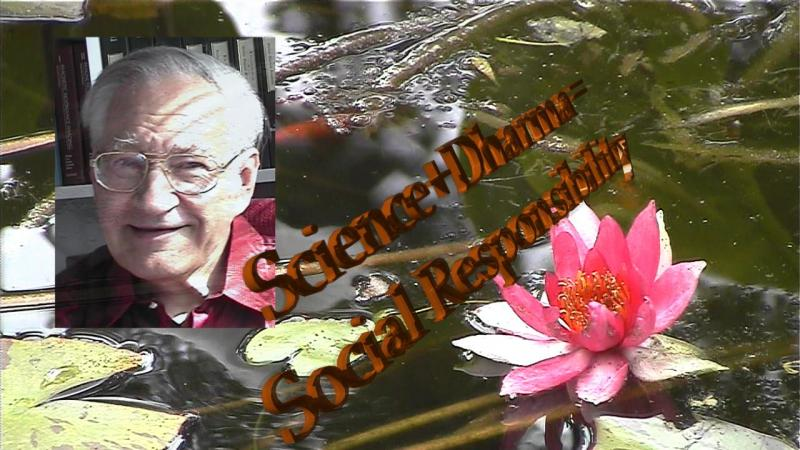
featuring Nobel Prize Winner, Dr. Richard R. Ernst and music composed by Jorgen Lauritsen

- 2009 Space Travelers (documentary) (executive producer, producer)

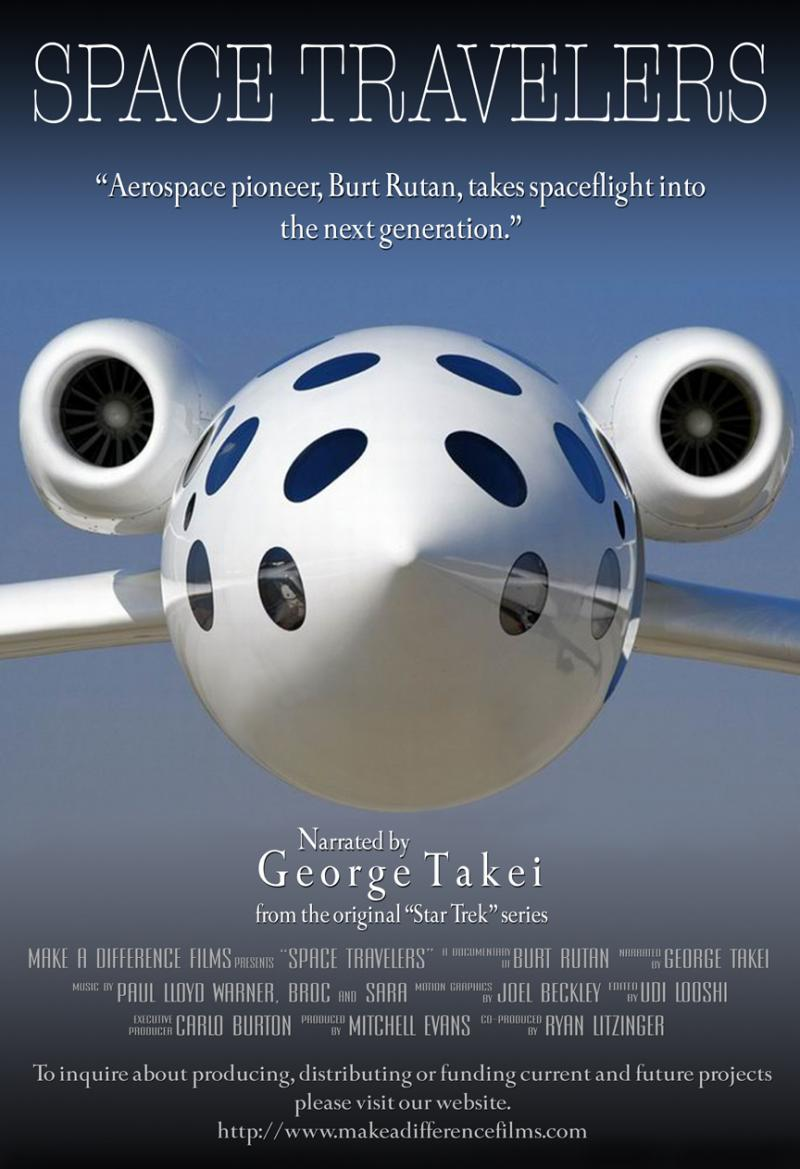
documentary of aerospace engineer Burt Rutan narrated by George Takei (Star Trek)

- 2007 The Trophy (producer)
- 2006 Look Away: A Tale from Salem (TV movie) (producer)
- 2005 Alex and Ro (producer)
- 2005 Portrait of Eve (producer)
- 1993 Sandman (associate producer)

=== Director ===
- 2018 Carlo Burton on the Ancient Roman Road to Switzerland (documentary)
- 2016 Nobel Prize Winner Roger Guillemin (documentary)
- 2016 Nobel Prize Winner Kary Mullis (documentary)
- 2015 Sherwood Rowland (documentary)
- 2013 Romains (documentary)
- 2012 Underground (documentary)
- 2012 Samba Parade in Humboldt CO (documentary)
- 2010 Chaos to Harmony (documentary)
- 2010 Virgin Sex Myth: False and Disastrous Cure of AIDS (documentary)
- 2010/I South Africa, Aids, Rape and Women's Rights (documentary)
- 2009 Science + Dharma = Social Responsibility (documentary)
- 2009 Space Travelers (documentary)
- 2007 The Trophy
- 2005 Alex and Ro
- 2005 Portrait of Eve

=== Cinematographer ===
- 2018 Carlo Burton on the Ancient Roman Road to Switzerland (documentary)
- 2016 Nobel Prize Winner Roger Guillemin (documentary)
- 2010 Chaos to Harmony (documentary)
- 2009 Science + Dharma = Social Responsibility (documentary)
- 2009 Space Travelers (documentary)
- 2007 The Trophy
- 2005 Alex and Ro
- 2005 Portrait of Eve

=== Editor ===
- 2018 Carlo Burton on the Ancient Roman Road to Switzerland (documentary)
- 2010 Virgin Sex Myth: False and Disastrous Cure of AIDS (documentary)
- 2009 Science + Dharma = Social Responsibility (documentary)
- 2009 Space Travelers (documentary)
- 2005 Alex and Ro

=== Actor ===
- 2007 The Trophy —Arthur
- 2005 Alex and Ro—Alex
- 2005 Portrait of Eve —Anthony
- 1994 Harts of the West (TV series) – Drive, He Said (1994) ... Gambler

=== Writer ===
- 2009 Science + Dharma = Social Responsibility (documentary) (writer)
- 2009 Space Travelers (documentary) (written by)
- 2005 Portrait of Eve

=== Casting director ===
- 2005 Portrait of Eve
