= Flip angle =

In magnetic resonance imaging, the flip angle, also called the nutation angle, pulse angle, tip angle, or excitation angle, refers to the angle that the magnetization vector is tipped or rotated away from the z-axis by a radiofrequency pulse, relative to the main magnetic field. The flip angle is generally measured in degrees or radians; for example, a 90-degree flip angle will deflect all longitudinal magnetization into the transverse, or xy plane. Changing the amplitude or duration of the pulse will change the flip angle.

The Ernst angle, named for Richard R. Ernst who described it, refers to the flip angle that will produce the maximal intensity of a signal for a given T1 relaxation time and repetition time.
