= Ernst angle =

In nuclear magnetic resonance spectroscopy and magnetic resonance imaging, the Ernst angle is the flip angle that maximizes the steady-state signal for a spin with a spin–lattice relaxation time $T_1$ using a flip repetition time $T_R$, assuming transverse magnetization is eliminated between flips. The Ernst angle $\theta$ is calculated using the following relationship, derived by Richard R. Ernst, who won the 1991 Nobel Prize in Chemistry:

$$\theta=\arccos(e^{-T_R/T_1})$$

The derivation of the Ernst angle equation explicitly assumes that all transverse magnetization is completely eliminated between repetition times. This elimination is achieved in practice through spoiler gradients (in MRI) or by using a long enough $T_R$ for complete $T_2$ decay (in NMR).

== Derivation ==
Let $M_z^-$ denote the longitudinal magnetization just before an RF pulse. Assume the pulse rotates magnetization by angle $\theta$ about the transverse axis instantaneously. Longitudinal magnetization after the pulse will be:

$$M_z^+=M_z^-\cos(\theta)$$

After relaxation for a time $T_R$ toward equilibrium $M_0$ with $T_1$ recovery the longitudinal component of magnetization will be:

$$M_z^{-(next)}=M_0-(M_0-M_z^+)e^{-T_R/T_1}=M_0-(M_0-M_z^-\cos(\theta))e^{-T_R/T_1}$$

Assume that transverse magnetization now becomes zero via spoiling. At steady state $M_z^{-(next)}=M_z^-$. Substituting $M_z^-$ for $M_z^{-(next)}$ and solving for $M_z^-$ gives:

$$M_z^-=\frac{M_0(1-e^{-T_R/T_1})}{1-e^{-T_R/T_1}\cos(\theta)}$$

Transverse magnetization (signal intensity) right after the pulse during steady state is then:

$$M_x^+=M_z^-\sin(\theta)=\frac{M_0(1-e^{-T_R/T_1})\sin(\theta)}{1-e^{-T_R/T_1}\cos(\theta)}$$

To find the $\theta$ that maximizes $M_x^+$ solve for $\frac{dM_x^+}{d\theta}=0$:

$$\begin{align}
E&=e^{-T_R/T_1}\\
A&=M_0(1-E)\\
M_x^+&=\frac{A\sin(\theta)}{1-E\cos(\theta)}
\end{align}$$

Using the quotient rule with $u=\sin(\theta)$ and $v=1-E\cos(\theta)$ it can be shown that:

$\frac{dM_x^+}{d\theta}=A\frac{\cos(\theta)-E}{(1-E\cos(\theta))^2}$

$\frac{dM_x^+}{d\theta}=0$ when $\theta=\arccos(e^{-T_R/T_1})$
