= Steady-state free precession imaging =

Magnetic resonance imaging sequence

4 chamber cardiac magnetic resonance imaging using SSFP cine imaging.

Steady-state free precession (SSFP) imaging is a magnetic resonance imaging (MRI) sequence which uses steady states of magnetizations. In general, SSFP MRI sequences are based on a (low flip angle) gradient echo MRI sequence with a short repetition time which in its generic form has been described as the FLASH MRI technique. While spoiled gradient-echo sequences refer to a steady state of the longitudinal magnetization only, SSFP gradient-echo sequences include transverse coherences (magnetizations) from overlapping multi-order spin echoes and stimulated echoes. This is usually accomplished by refocusing the phase-encoding gradient in each repetition interval in order to keep the phase integral (or gradient moment) constant. Fully balanced SSFP MRI sequences achieve a phase of zero by refocusing all imaging gradients.

== Gradient moments are zero or not ==
If, within one TR, either one of the gradient moments of magnetic gradients along three logical directions, including slice selection direction (G_{ss}), phase encoding (G_{pe}) and readout (G_{ro}), is not zero, then spins along such direction obtain different phases, making the signal intensity (SI) of a single voxel the vector sum of magnetizations therein. It causes some inevitable loss of signal. Such situations belong to ordinary SSFP imaging, with its commercial names listed below.

Otherwise, if all gradient moments are zero within one TR, i.e. gradients of opposite polarities cancel out, then there are no additional effects on the phase from gradients; that is to say, SI of each voxels is the contributions of a series of RF pulses and relaxation phenomena. Although the principles underlying echo formation in balanced SSFP have long been known, widespread clinical implementation has been slow due to stringent technical requirements. bSSFP sequences demand a very high level of magnetic field homogeneity and control over gradient switching and shaping. The refocusing mechanism fails if intravoxel dephasing exceeds over ±180º manifest by band-like artifacts. During the last decade modern scanners have overcome these limitations making bSSFP a viable and useful sequence on most mid- and high-field systems. When the echo is recorded close to the middle of the interval (TE ≈ TR/2, as is usually the case), the final term e−TE/T2 depends on T2, not T2*. Thus, bSSFP sequences behave more like spin echo than gradient echo sequences in that they do not have T2*-dependence. Also, since TR is nearly always much, much shorter than T1 or T2, the exponential terms containing TR can be disregarded.

== Localizer ==
SSFP is beneficial as a localizer sequence, such as for initial images of the anal canal in order to align the planes of subsequent T2-weighted images to be cross-sections and longitudinal sections of the canal. A particular SSFP used for this purpose is one termed TRUE FISP by Siemens, FIESTA by GE, and balanced FFE by Philips.

== Commercial names ==
SSFP protocols have different names among different MRI manufacturers.

Academic Classification	Steady-State Free Precession (SSFP)		Balanced Steady-State Free Precession (bSSFP)
Academic Classification	FID-like	Echo-like	Balanced Steady-State Free Precession (bSSFP)
Siemens	FISP; Fast Imaging with Steady-state Precession	PSIF; Reversed FISP	TrueFISP; True FISP
GE	GRASS; Gradiant Recall Acquisition using Steady States	SSFP; Steady State Free Precession	FIESTA; Fast Imaging Employing Steady-state Acquisition
Philips	FFE; Fast Field Echo	T_{2}-FFE; T_{2}-weighted Fast Field Echo	b-FFE; Balanced Fast Field Echo

== See also ==
- MRI
- FLASH MRI
