= Spin–lattice relaxation =

Physical phenomenon

During nuclear magnetic resonance observations, spin–lattice relaxation is the mechanism by which the longitudinal component of the total nuclear magnetic moment vector (parallel to the constant magnetic field) exponentially relaxes from a higher energy, non-equilibrium state to thermodynamic equilibrium with its surroundings (the "lattice"). It is characterized by the spin–lattice relaxation time, a time constant known as $T_1$.

There is a different parameter, $T_2$, the spin–spin relaxation time, which concerns the exponential relaxation of the transverse component of the nuclear magnetization vector (perpendicular to the external magnetic field). Measuring the variation of $T_1$ and $T_2$ in different materials is the basis for some magnetic resonance imaging techniques.

== Nuclear physics ==
T_{1} relaxation or longitudinal relaxation curve

The rate at which the longitudinal $M_z$ component of the magnetization vector recovers exponentially towards its thermodynamic equilibrium is governed by the time $T_1$, according to equation
$$M_z(t) = M_{z,\mathrm{eq}} - \left [ M_{z,\mathrm{eq}} - M_{z}(0) \right ] e^{-t/T_1},$$
or, for the specific case that $M_z(0)=-M_{z,\mathrm{eq}}$,
$$M_z(t) = M_{z,\mathrm{eq}} \left ( 1 - 2e^{-t/T_1}\right ).$$

Thus, $T_1$ is the time it takes for the longitudinal magnetization to recover approximately 63% (exactly $1-1/$e) of its initial value after being flipped into the magnetic transverse plane by a 90° radiofrequency pulse.

Nuclei are contained within a molecular structure, and are in constant vibrational and rotational motion, creating a complex magnetic field. The magnetic field caused by thermal motion of nuclei within the lattice is called the lattice field. The lattice field of a nucleus in a lower energy state can interact with nuclei in a higher energy state, causing the energy of the higher energy state to distribute itself between the two nuclei. Therefore, the energy gained by nuclei from the RF pulse is dissipated as increased vibration and rotation within the lattice, which can slightly increase the temperature of the sample. The name spin–lattice relaxation refers to the process in which the spins give the energy they obtained from the RF pulse back to the surrounding lattice, thereby restoring their equilibrium state. The same process occurs after the spin energy has been altered by a change of the surrounding static magnetic field (e.g. pre-polarization by or insertion into high magnetic field) or if the nonequilibrium state has been achieved by other means (e.g., hyperpolarization by optical pumping).

The relaxation time, $T_1$ (the average lifetime of nuclei in the higher energy state) is dependent on the gyromagnetic ratio of the nucleus and the mobility of the lattice. As mobility increases, the vibrational and rotational frequencies increase, making it more likely for a component of the lattice field to be able to stimulate the transition from high to low energy states. However, at extremely high mobilities, the probability decreases as the vibrational and rotational frequencies no longer correspond to the energy gap between states.

Different tissues have different $T_1$ values. For example, fluids have long $T_1$ (1500-2000 ms), and water-based tissues are in the 400-1200 ms range, while fat based tissues are in the shorter 100-150 ms range. The presence of strongly magnetic ions or particles (e.g., ferromagnetic or paramagnetic) also strongly alter $T_1$ values and are widely used as MRI contrast agents.

== T_{1} weighted images ==
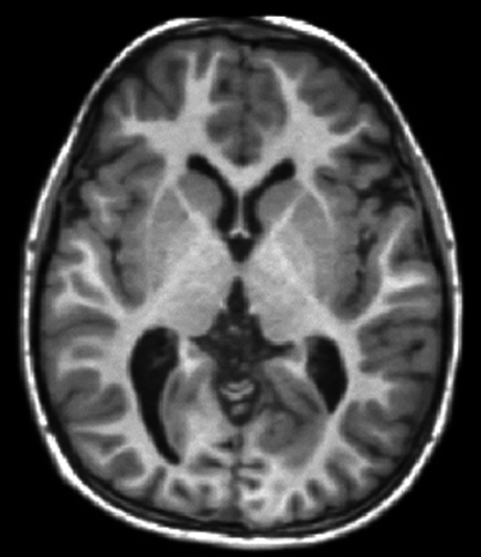
A $T_1$ weighted image of the head.

Magnetic resonance imaging uses the resonance of the protons to generate images. Protons are excited by a radio frequency pulse at an appropriate frequency (Larmor frequency) and then the excess energy is released in the form of a minuscule amount of heat to the surroundings as the spins return to their thermal equilibrium. The magnetization of the proton ensemble goes back to its equilibrium value with an exponential curve characterized by a time constant $T_1$ (see Relaxation (NMR)).

$T_1$ weighted images can be obtained by setting short repetition time (TR) such as < 750 ms and echo time (TE) such as < 40 ms in conventional spin echo sequences, while in Gradient Echo Sequences they can be obtained by using flip angles of larger than 50^{o} while setting TE values to less than 15 ms.

$T_1$ is significantly different between grey matter and white matter and is used when undertaking brain scans. A strong $T_1$ contrast is present between fluid and more solid anatomical structures, making $T_1$ contrast suitable for morphological assessment of the normal or pathological anatomy, e.g., for musculoskeletal applications.

== In the rotating frame ==
Spin–lattice relaxation in the rotating frame is the mechanism by which M_{xy}, the transverse component of the magnetization vector, exponentially decays towards its equilibrium value of zero, under the influence of a radio frequency (RF) field in nuclear magnetic resonance (NMR) and magnetic resonance imaging (MRI). It is characterized by the spin–lattice relaxation time constant in the rotating frame, T_{1ρ}. It is named in contrast to $T_1$, the spin–lattice relaxation time.

$T_{1 \rho}$_{ρ} MRI is an alternative to conventional $T_1$ and $T_2$ MRI by its use of a long-duration, low-power radio frequency referred to as spin-lock (SL) pulse applied to the magnetization in the transverse plane. The magnetization is effectively spin-locked around an effective B_{1} field created by the vector sum of the applied B_{1} and any off-resonant component. The spin-locked magnetization will relax with a time constant $T_{1 \rho}$, which is the time it takes for the magnetic resonance signal to reach approximately 37% (exactly $1/e$) of its initial value, $M_{xy}(0)$. Hence the relation: $M_{xy}(t_{\rm SL}) = M_{xy}(0) e^{-t_{\rm SL}/T_{1\rho}} \,$ , where t_{SL} is the duration of the RF field.

=== Measurement ===
$T_{1 \rho}$ can be quantified (relaxometry) by curve fitting the signal expression above as a function of the duration of the spin-lock pulse while the amplitude of spin-lock pulse (γB_{1}~0.1-few kHz) is fixed. Quantitative $T_{1 \rho}$ MRI relaxation maps reflect the biochemical composition of tissues.

=== Imaging ===
$T_{1 \rho}$ MRI has been used to image tissues such as cartilage, intervertebral discs, brain, and heart, as well as certain types of cancers.

== See also ==
- Relaxation (NMR)
- Spin–spin relaxation time
- Ernst angle
