= Richard R. Ernst =

Swiss physical chemist and Nobel laureate (1933–2021)

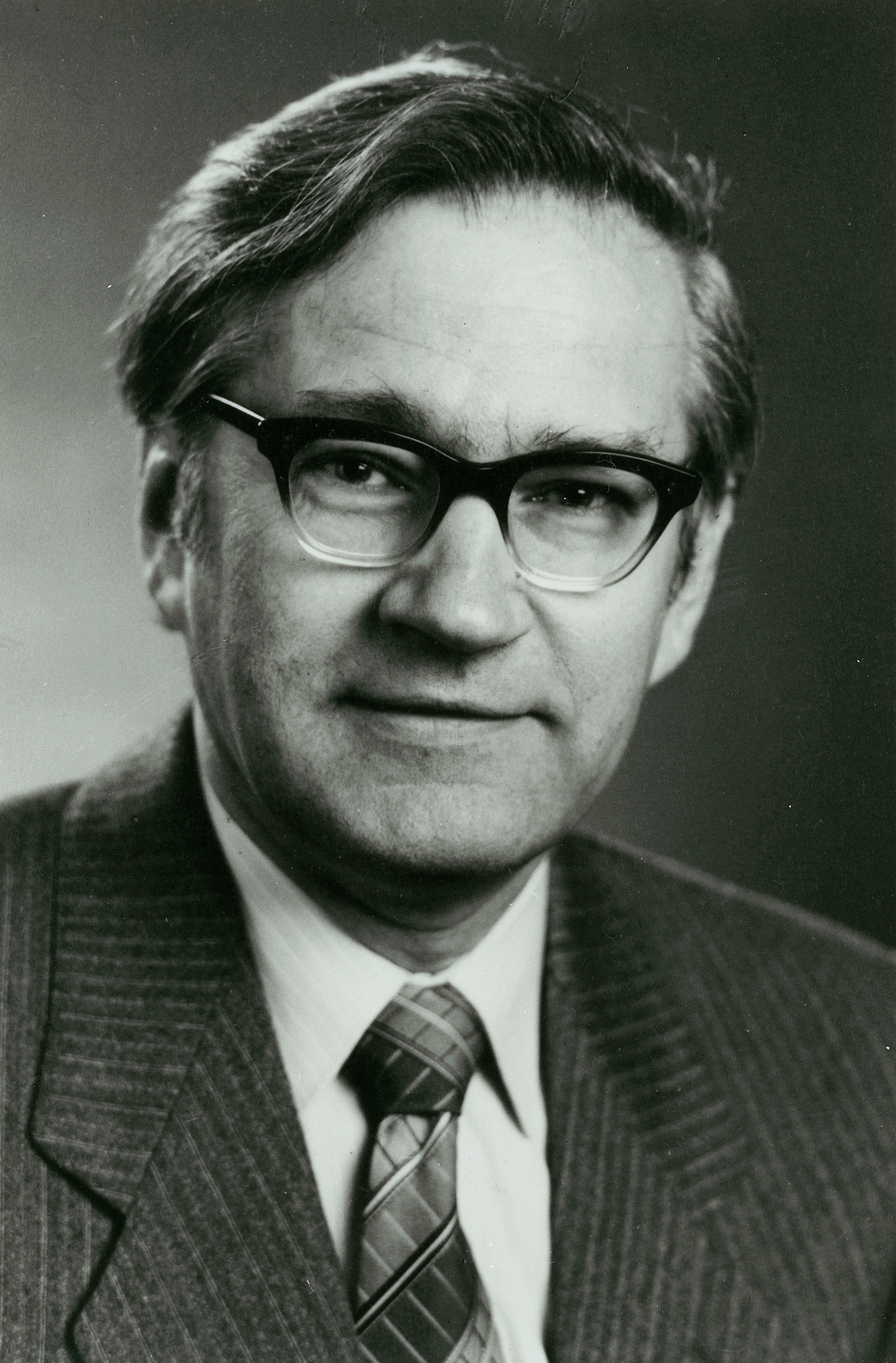
- Ernst in the 1980s
- Born: Richard Robert Ernst; 14 August 1933; Winterthur, Switzerland
- Died: 4 June 2021 (aged 87); Winterthur, Switzerland
- Education: ETH Zurich (PhD)
- Known for: Ernst angle; Fourier transform NMR spectroscopy; 2D NMR spectroscopy/Nuclear Overhauser effect spectroscopy/Exclusive correlation spectroscopy; 3D NMR spectroscopy
- Awards: Marcel Benoist Prize (1985); Nobel Prize for Chemistry (1991); Wolf Prize in Chemistry (1991); Louisa Gross Horwitz Prize (1991)
- Scientific career
- Fields: Chemistry; Physics
- Workplaces: ETH Zurich; Varian Associates
- Thesis: Kernresonanz-Spektroskopie mit stochastischen Hochfrequenzfeldern (1962)
- Doctoral advisors: Hans H. Günthard; Hans Primas
- Doctoral students: Marc Baldus
- Website: chab.ethz.ch/en/the-department/people/emeriti/emeriti-homepages/richard-ernst.html

Richard Robert Ernst (14 August 1933 – 4 June 2021) was a Swiss physical chemist and Nobel laureate.

Ernst was awarded the Nobel Prize in Chemistry in 1991 for his contributions towards the development of Fourier transform nuclear magnetic resonance (NMR) spectroscopy while at Varian Associates and ETH Zurich. These underpin applications to both to chemistry with NMR spectroscopy and to medicine with magnetic resonance imaging (MRI).

He humbly referred to himself as a "tool-maker" rather than a scientist.

== Early life ==
Ernst was born in Winterthur, Switzerland on 14 August 1933 to Robert Ernst and Irma Ernst-Brunner. He was the oldest of three children of Irma Brunner and Robert Ernst. He grew up in a house built in 1898 by his grandfather, who was a merchant. During his childhood, he was interested in music, playing the violoncello and even considering a career as a musical composer. At 13-years old, Ernst stumbled upon a box of chemicals belonging to his late uncle, a metallurgical engineer. Young Ernst was excited by what he found, and set about trying all conceivable reactions, some of which resulted in explosions that terrified his parents.

== Education ==
He enrolled in the Eidgenössische Technische Hochschule (ETH) in Zurich to study chemistry and received his diploma in 1957 as a “Diplomierter Ingenieur Chemiker''. He was disappointed in the course content, so conducted further research and taught himself quantum mechanics and thermodynamics in his spare time. After a break to complete his military service, Ernst earned his Ph.D. in physical chemistry in 1962 from ETH Zurich. His dissertation was on nuclear magnetic resonance in the field of physical chemistry.

== Career ==
Ernst entered Varian Associates as a scientist in 1963 and invented Fourier transform NMR, noise decoupling, and a number of other methods. He returned to ETH Zurich in 1968 and became a lecturer. His career developed into assistant professor in 1970 and associate professor in 1972. From 1976, Richard R. Ernst was Full Professor of Physical Chemistry.

Ernst led a research group dedicated to magnetic resonance spectroscopy, and was the director of the Physical Chemistry Laboratory at the ETH Zurich. He developed two-dimensional NMR and several novel pulse techniques. He retired in 1998. He participated in the development of medical magnetic resonance tomography, as well as the NMR structure determination of biopolymers in solution collaborating with Professor Kurt Wüthrich. He also participated in the study of intra-molecular dynamics.

== Awards and honours ==
Richard R. Ernst, UNESCO 2011

Ernst was a foreign fellow of the Estonian Academy of Sciences (elected 2002), the US National Academy of Sciences, the Royal Academy of Sciences, London, the German National Academy of Sciences Leopoldina, the Russian Academy of Sciences, the Korean Academy of Science and Technology and Bangladesh Academy of Sciences. He was elected a Foreign Member of the Royal Society (ForMemRS) in 1993. He was awarded the John Gamble Kirkwood Medal in 1989.

In 1991, Ernst was on an aeroplane flying over the Atlantic when he discovered he had been awarded The Nobel Prize in Chemistry. He was invited into the cockpit, where he was given a radio to talk to the Nobel committee. Here they told him he was being honoured "for his contributions to the development of the methodology of high resolution nuclear magnetic resonance (NMR) spectroscopy".

Ernst was a member of the World Knowledge Dialogue Scientific Board. He was awarded the Marcel Benoist Prize in 1986, the Wolf Prize in Chemistry in 1991, and Louisa Gross Horwitz Prize of Columbia University in 1991. He was also awarded the Tadeus Reichstein Medal in 2000 and the Order of the Star of Romania in 2004. He also held Honorary Doctorates from the Technical University of Munich, EPF Lausanne, University of Zurich, University Antwerpen, Babes-Bolyai University, and University Montpellier.

The 2009 Bel Air Film Festival featured the world premiere of a documentary film on Ernst Science Plus Dharma Equals Social Responsibility. Produced by Carlo Burton, the film takes place in Ernst's hometown in Switzerland. In 2022, another movie about Richard R. Ernst premiered at the Cameo cinema in Winterthur, produced by Lukas Schwarzenbacher and Susanne Schmid. The documentary contains a retrospective of Richard R. Ernsts life, which was filmed only a few months before his death.

== Personal life ==
Ernst was married to Magdalena (Kielholz) until his death. Together, they had three children: Anna Magdalena, Katharina Elisabeth and Hans-Martin Walter. Besides toiling with his work, Ernst also enjoyed music and art, specifically Tibetan scroll art. Using scientific techniques, Ernst would research the pigments on the scrolls to learn about their geographic origin and age.

Ernst died on 4 June 2021 in Winterthur at the age of 87.

== Selected bibliography ==
- Principles of Nuclear Magnetic Resonance in One and Two Dimensions, Clarendon Press, 1987
- Richard R. Ernst: Nobelpreisträger aus Winterthur, Hier und Jetzt, Baden 2020
- Alois Feusi: Richard Ernst: Der Selbstzweifler, dem der Nobelpreis peinlich war. Summary of his autobiography. Neue Zürcher Zeitung, 21 May 2020. Retrieved 22 May 2020
