= Slowness (seismology) =

In seismology, slowness (symbol p or s) is a physical quantity defined as the reciprocal of velocity, $p=v ^{-1}$. It has quantity dimension (and unit of measurement) of time per distance (seconds per metre), instead of distance per time (metres per second) used in velocity. In general it is a vector quantity, the slowness vector, but it may also be defined as a scalar quantity, the reciprocal speed. In running, slowness is known as pace.

== Travel time ==
The product of slowness in a medium and the distance propagated by a wave equals the wave propagation delay (or travel time). On Earth, slowness is affected primarily by densities.

If we split the path followed by the ray into N segments (numbered i = 1, 2, ..., N), the total travel time of the wave is

$$\Gamma = \sum_{i = 1}^{N} s_{i} \Delta x_{i}$$

Therefore, the residual travel time is due to departures in slowness experienced by the wave along the raypath.

== Sonic well logs ==
Measurements of interval transit time, designated ${\Delta} t$, made during wireline logging are used to determine sonic velocities of the wallrock in boreholes. The tool used has sources and receivers that are in contact with the wellbore and it measures the delay between the source being triggered and the signal being received. The measurements are normally in the units of microseconds per foot and are recorded on the well log.
