= Free induction decay =

Resonance signal

Free induction decay (FID) nuclear magnetic resonance signal seen from a well shimmed sample

In Fourier transform nuclear magnetic resonance spectroscopy, free induction decay (FID) is the observable nuclear magnetic resonance (NMR) signal generated by non-equilibrium nuclear spin magnetization precessing about the magnetic field (conventionally along z). This non-equilibrium magnetization can be created generally by applying a pulse of radio-frequency close to the Larmor frequency of the nuclear spins.

If the magnetization vector has a non-zero component in the XY plane, then the precessing magnetisation will induce a corresponding oscillating voltage in a detection coil surrounding the sample. This time-domain signal (a sinusoid) is typically digitised and then Fourier transformed in order to obtain a frequency spectrum of the NMR signal i.e. the NMR spectrum.

The duration of the NMR signal is ultimately limited by T_{2} relaxation, but mutual interference of the different NMR frequencies present also causes the signal to be damped more quickly. When NMR frequencies are well-resolved, as is typically the case in the NMR of samples in solution, the overall decay of the FID is relaxation-limited and the FID is approximately exponential (with the time constant T_{2} changed, indicated by T_{2}^{*}). FID durations will then be of the order of seconds for nuclei such as ^{1}H.

Particularly if a limited number of frequency components are present, the FID may be analysed directly for quantitative determinations of physical properties, such as hydrogen content in aviation fuel, solid and liquid ratio in dairy products (time-domain NMR).

FID has also been observed in the optical region. Instead of nuclear spins, optical FID is caused by electric dipole radiation caused by an oscillating dipole moment.

Advances in the development of quantum-scale sensors, particularly NV centres, have enabled the observation of the FID of single nuclei. When measuring the precession of a single nucleus, quantum mechanical measurement back action has to be considered. In this special case, also the measurement itself contributes to the decay as predicted by quantum mechanics.
