= Lists of sportspeople =

There are a variety of articles listing sportspeople of a particular sport.

- Archers
- Baseball players (Major League Baseball)
- Basketball players
  - Basketball players (Men's National Basketball Association)
  - Basketball players (Women's National Basketball Association)
- Beach volleyball players
- Boxers
  - Female boxers
  - Male boxers
- Bullfighters
- Cricketers
  - Oldest cricketers
- Curlers
- Cyclists
- Dancers
- Divers
- Disc golf
- Fencers
- Figure skaters
- Football games
  - American football players
  - Association football players
  - Gaelic footballers
  - List of lists of Pro Bowl players
- Golfers
  - Female golfers
  - Male golfers
- Grand Prix motorcycle racers
- Gymnasts
- Heptathletes
- Ice hockey players (National Hockey League)
- Jockeys
- Kickboxers
  - Female kickboxers
  - Male kickboxers
- Judoka
- Marathon runners
- Martial artists
- Mixed martial arts
  - Female mixed martial artists
  - Male mixed martial artists
  - UFC fighters
  - Bellator MMA fighters
- Motocross riders
- Orienteers
- Pickleball
- Polo players
- Pro skaters
- Race walkers
- Roller skaters
- Rowers
- Rugby union players
- Skiers
- Speed skaters
- Sporting knights and dames
- Sprinters
- Squash players
- Surfers
- Swimmers
- Synchronised swimmers
- Table tennis players
- Track and field athletes
  - Hammer throwers
  - Javelin throwers
  - Male hurdlers
  - Marathoners
  - Long-distance runners
  - Middle-distance runners
- Racing drivers
- Triathletes
- Tennis players
  - Female tennis players
  - Male singles tennis players
  - Male doubles tennis players
- Ultimate disc players
- Volleyball players
- Water polo players
- Wrestlers
  - Amateur wrestlers
  - Professional wrestlers

== See also ==
- List of sports
- List of sportswomen
- List of people by occupation
- List of sports announcers
- List of television reporters
- Sportsmanship
