= Football player =

Sports person who plays football

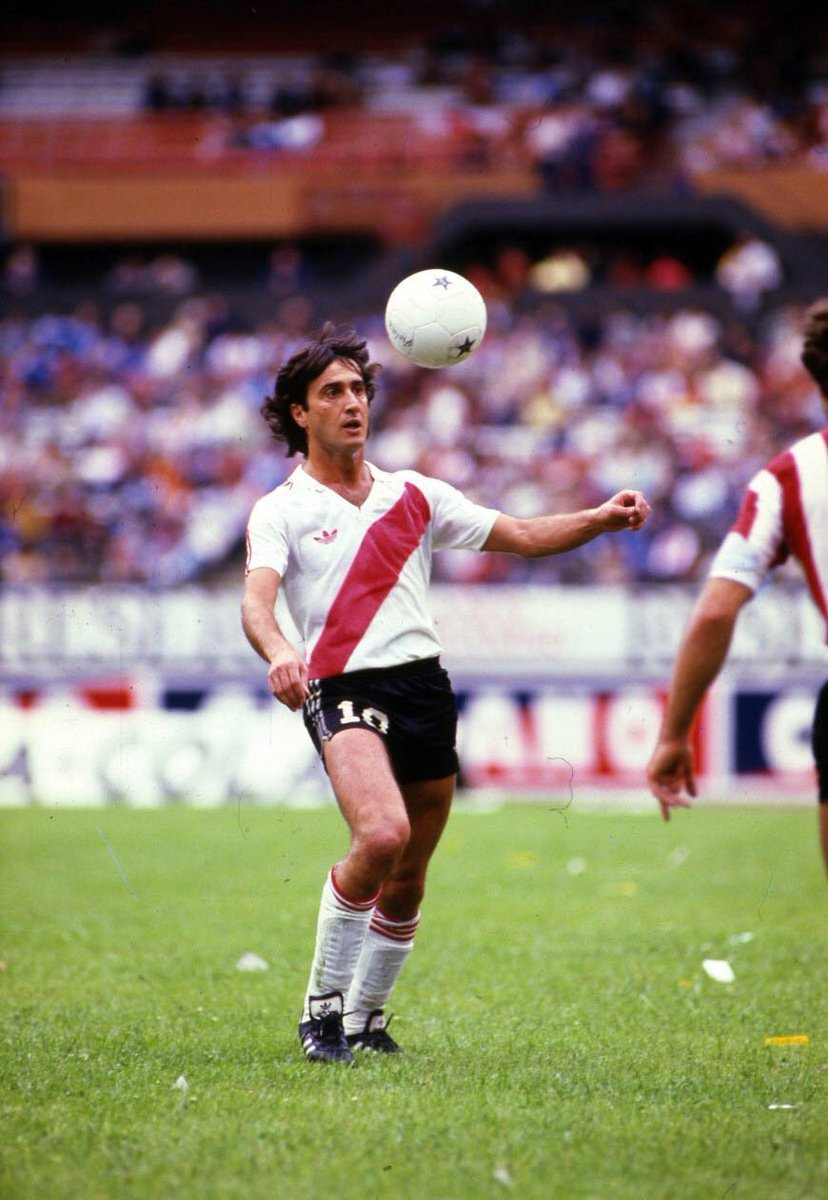
A men's association football player (Norberto Alonso)

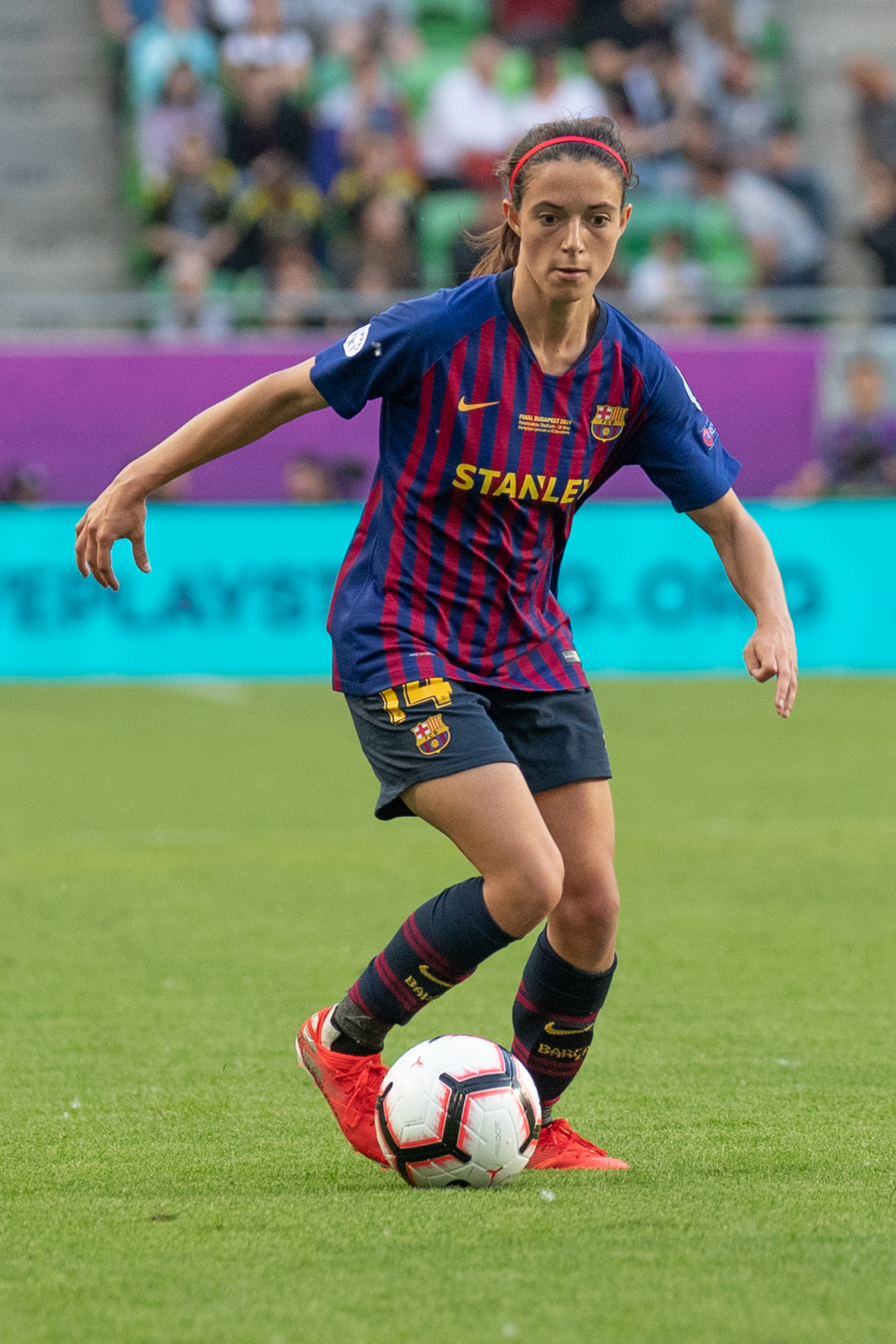
A women's association football player (Aitana Bonmatí)

A football player or footballer is a sportsperson who plays one of the different types of football. The main types of football are association football, American football, Canadian football, Australian rules football, Gaelic football, rugby league, and rugby union.

It has been estimated that there are 250 million association football players in the world, and many play other forms of football.

== Career ==
Jean-Pierre Papin has described football as a "universal language". Footballers across the world and at almost any level may regularly attract large crowds of spectators, and players are the focal points of widespread social phenomena such as association football culture.

Footballers usually begin as amateurs and the best players progress to become professional players. Normally they start at a youth team (any local team) and from there, based on skill and talent, scouts offer contracts. Once signed, some learn to play better football and a few advance to the senior or professional teams.

=== Pay ===
Pay in some top men's leagues is significantly higher than in other jobs. Players in the Premier League earn an average of $3 million per year. In the wealthiest clubs in European football leagues, men earn an average of $7.19 million per year. The best players of those clubs can earn up to $260 million per year.

However, only a fraction of men's professional football players are paid at this level. Wages may be somewhat more moderate in other divisions and leagues. For example, the average annual salary for footballers in Major League Soccer (MLS) is $530,262 as of May 2023.

Average salaries in women's leagues are far lower. For example, players in the National Women's Soccer League (NWSL), which started in 2012, earn an average of $54,000 per year as of May 2022. For the first time in 2022, the NWSL guaranteed players a living wage. The minimum salary in 2023 is $36,400 to ensure players do not need second or third jobs to survive.

=== Post-retirement ===
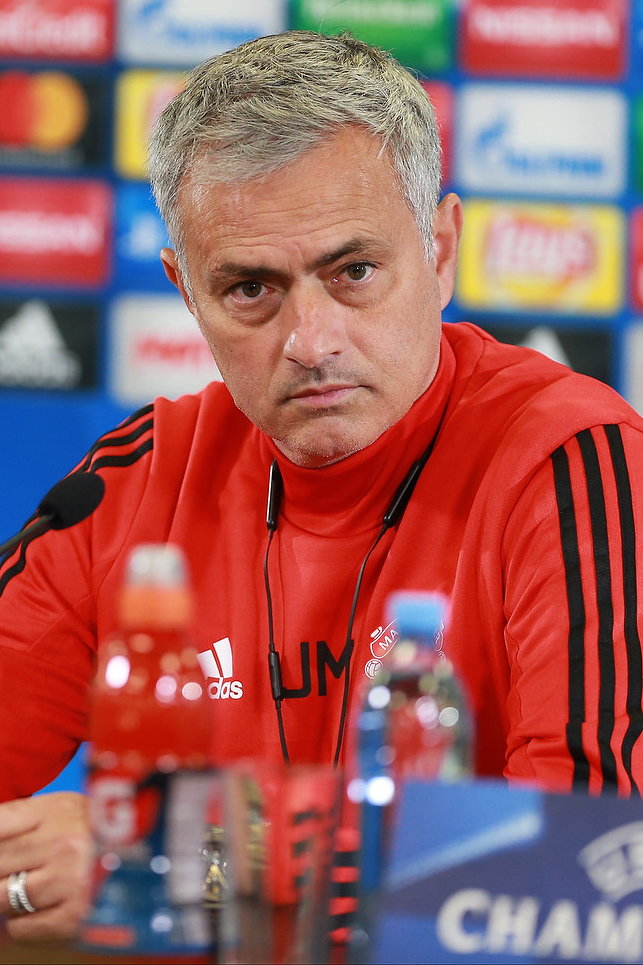
José Mourinho is a retired football player who post-retirement has worked as a football manager.

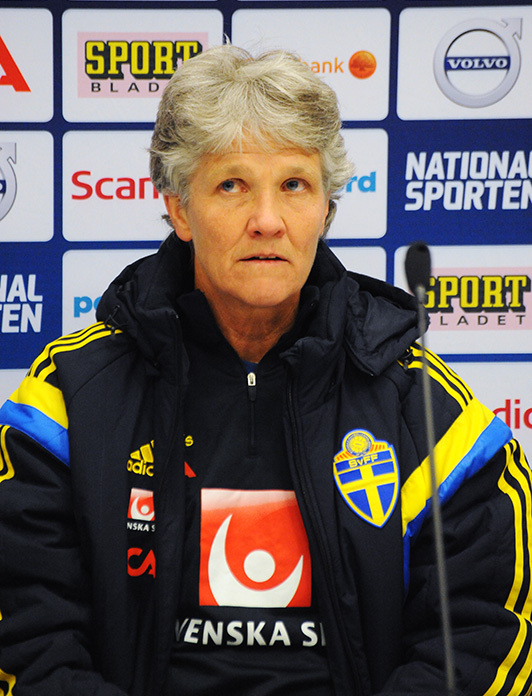
Pia Sundhage is a retired football player who post-retirement has worked as the football manager for the United States and Sweden national teams.

A minority of retired footballers continue working full-time in football, for instance as football managers. A 1979 study reported that former first-team ballplayers were over-represented as top-ranking executives in their companies and had greater income mobility than second-teamers and reserves. However, some experience chronic health issues, see below.

== Skills and specialties ==
=== Association football specialties (positions) ===
In association football, there are four traditional types of specialties (positions): goalkeepers (goalies), defenders (full-backs), midfielders (half-backs), and forwards (attackers). Special purpose positions include such performers as sweepers, stoppers, second forwards (under-attackers), wingers, insiders, etc.

- Goalkeepers: good reflexes, communication with defence, one-on-one ability, command of the penalty area and aerial intelligence.
- Centre-backs: good heading and tackling ability, height, bravery in attempting challenges, and concentration.
- Full-backs: pace, stamina, anticipation, tackling and marking abilities, work rate, and team responsibility.
- Central midfielders: stamina, passing ability, team responsibility, positioning, marking abilities.
- Wingers: pace, technical ability like dribbling and close control, off-the-ball intelligence, creativity.
- Forwards: finishing ability, composure, technical ability, heading ability, pace, off-the-ball intelligence.

=== American football ===
The American football teams' positions are categorized by a form of play where each of them has its spectrum of positions. Those are offensive, defensive, and special teams.

== Health issues ==
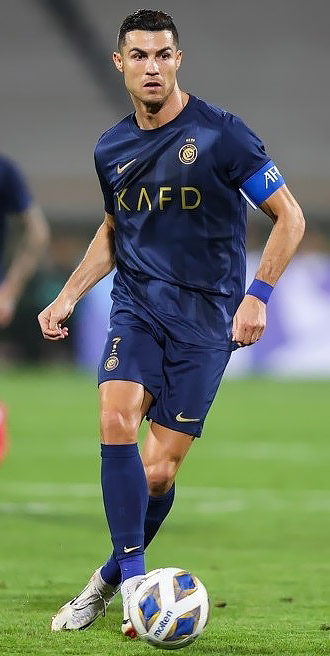
Cristiano Ronaldo, an example of a "lean and muscular" men's association football player

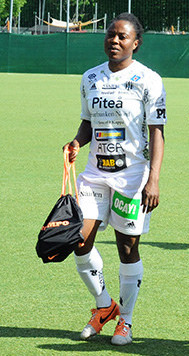
Faith Ikidi, an example of a "lean and muscular" women's association football player

An Irish 2002 study of association and Gaelic football players characterized players as "lean and muscular with a reasonably high level of capacity in all areas of physical performance". The opposite is the case for American football, where obesity could be the cause of grave health problems.

A 2000 study documented injuries sustained by Czech [association] football players at all levels:

Trauma was the cause of 81.5% of the injuries, and overuse was the cause of 18.5%. Joint sprains predominated (30%), followed by fractures (16%), muscle strains (15%), ligament ruptures (12%), meniscal tears and contusions (8%), and other injuries. Injuries to the knee were most prevalent (29%), followed by injuries to the ankle (19%) and spine (9%). More injuries occurred during games (59%) than in practice.

Patellar tendinitis (knee pain) is considered an injury that comes from overexertion, which also happens to other athletes of virtually every sport. It is a common problem that football players develop and can usually be treated by a quadriceps strengthening program. Jumping activities place particularly high strains on the tendon and with repetitive jumping, tearing and injury of the tendon can occur. The chronic injury and healing response results in inflammation and localized pain.

Although levels of depression and pain in retired football players are on par with the societal average, some players suffer from post-retirement chronic injuries. Head injuries are a particular concern, with chronic traumatic encephalopathy (CTE) receiving increased scrutiny.

=== Life expectancy ===
Studies have long shown former American football NFL players have a longer life expectancy than the general public or males with a similar age and race distribution, but a higher rate of cardiovascular issues. A study comparing the deaths of former Major League Baseball players found baseball players lived longer still, perhaps suggesting a "healthy worker" bias where NFL athletes lived less long than they would otherwise have, despite their longer than average life expectancy. A 2009 review of the evidence in the American Journal of Medicine concluded the existing evidence "did not suggest an increased mortality" but does "suggest increased cardiovascular risk..., particularly the heavier linemen."

In association football, a 2011 German study found that German national team players lived 1.9 years less than the general male population.

Football players participating in international matches for Germany have reduced longevity compared to the general population. This disadvantage was the larger, the earlier the international football player started his international career. This finding is in line with the current knowledge of life expectancy in major athletes, especially those from other team sports

A 1983 study of rugby players found that the life expectancy of All Blacks was the same as for the general population.

Australian rules footballers have lower death rates than the general population.

=== Head ===
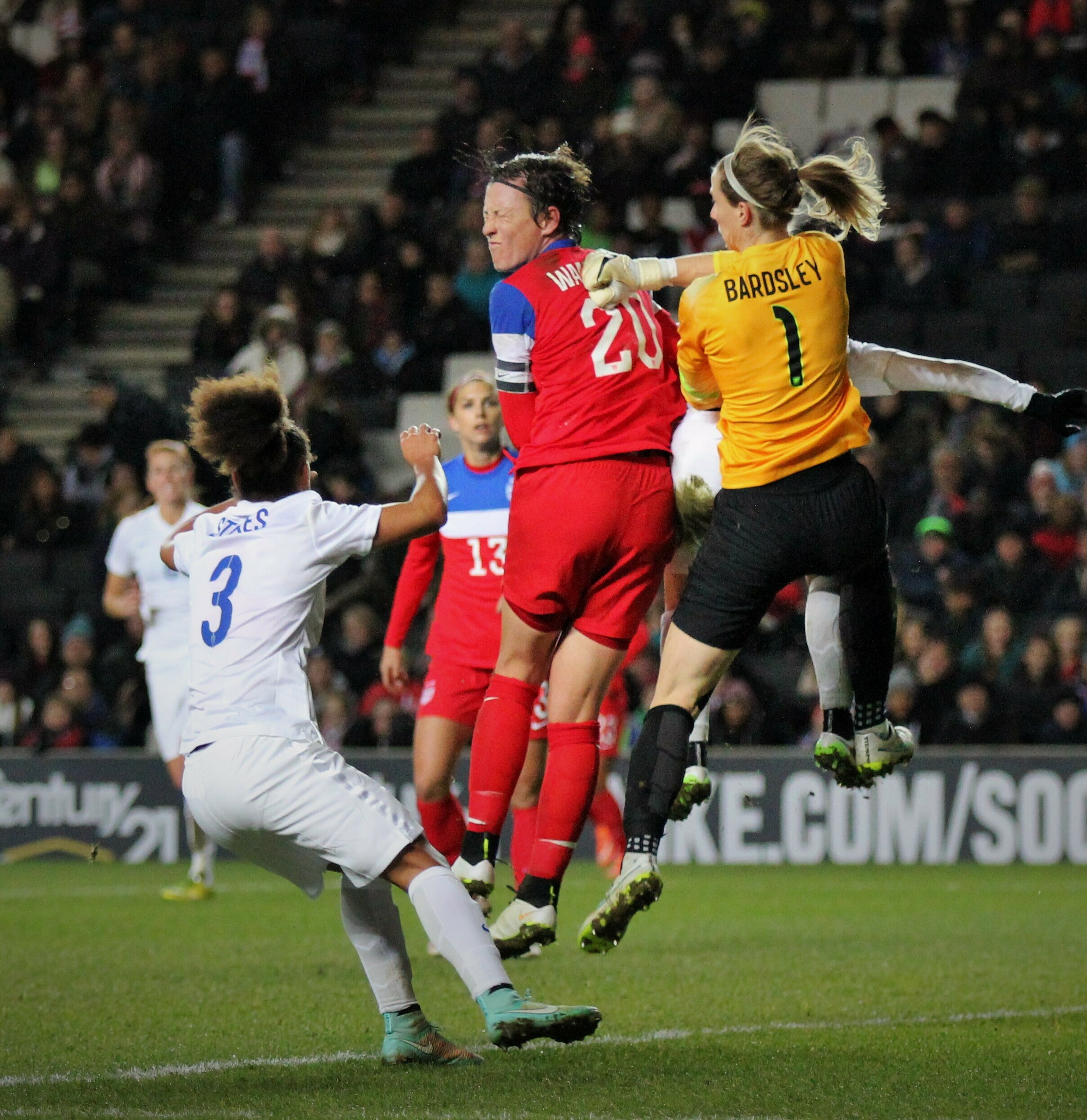
Abby Wambach, a retired player known for scoring header goals

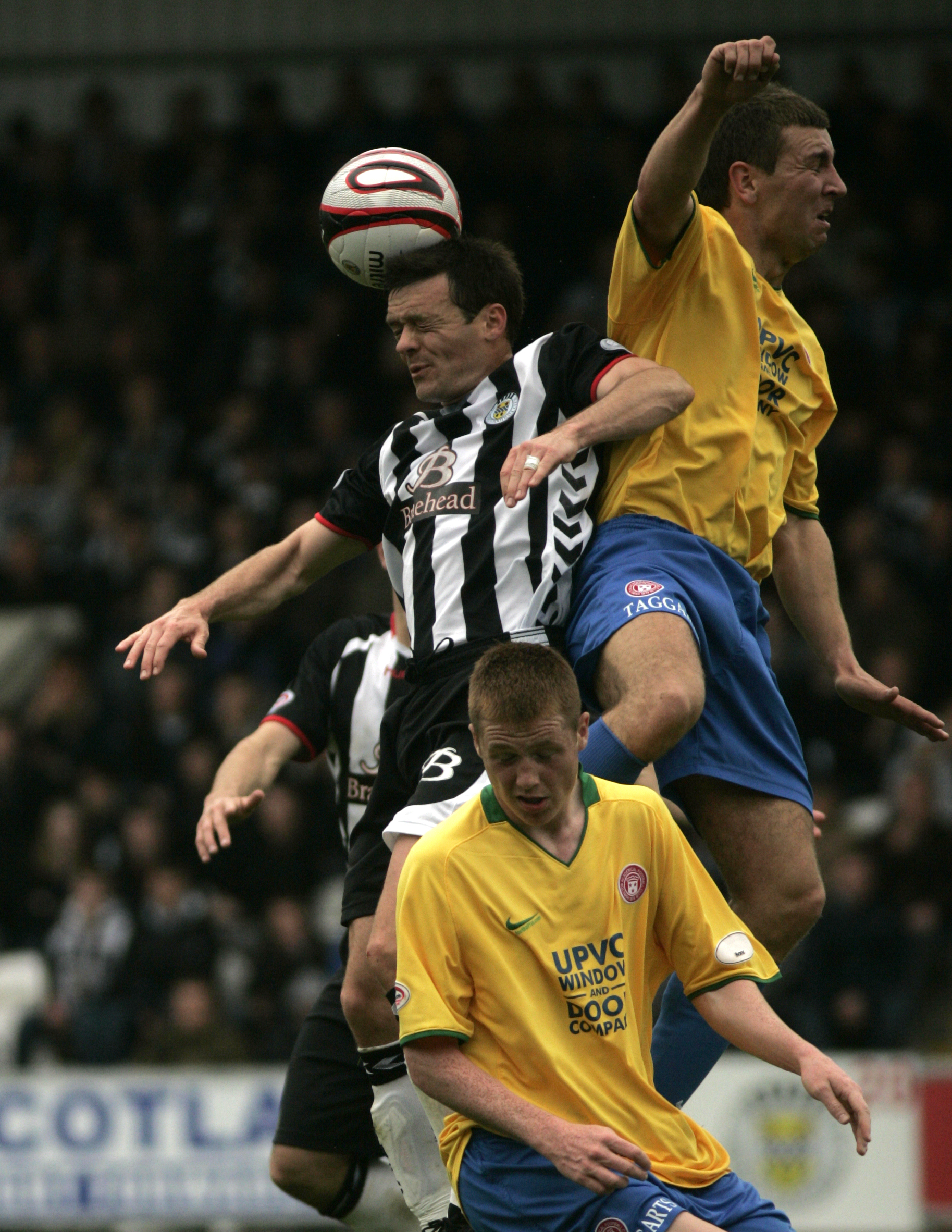
Heading of the ball in association football can increase the risk of chronic brain damage.

American football players are prone to head injuries such as concussions. In later life, this increases the risk of dementia and Alzheimer's. Professional American football players self-reporting concussions are at greater risk for having depressive episodes later in life compared with those retired players self-reporting no concussions.

Probably due to the repeated trauma associated with heading balls, professional association football has been suggested to increase the incidence of amyotrophic lateral sclerosis. In a 1987 study of former Norwegian association football national team players, one third of the players were found to have central cerebral atrophy, i.e. brain damage. A 1999 study connected soccer to chronic traumatic head injury (CTHI):

[P]articipation in amateur association football in general and concussion specifically is associated with impaired performance in memory and planning functions. Due to the worldwide popularity of soccer, these observations may have important public health implications

=== Knee ===
Anterior cruciate ligaments are particularly vulnerable in most types of football due to injuries that can be sustained during tackles.

=== Hip ===
An increased incidence of osteoarthritis in the hip joint has been found in retired football players.

=== Muscles ===
A 2012 study of association football injuries found that 19% of all injuries were muscle injuries, of which 54% affected the thigh muscles.

=== Sleep and psychological functioning ===
In a 2009 study, association football was found to be associated with favourable sleep patterns and psychological functioning in adolescent male football players.

The rate of suicide among former NFL players has been found to be 59% lower than in the general population.

=== FIFA response ===
In 2012, FIFA released a paper intended to identify key risk factors for association football players.

== Longevity and factors of mortality ==
In 2015, a systematic review of a sample of fifty-four peer-reviewed publications and three articles on elite athletes’ mortality and longevity, resulted in major longevity outcomes for the elite athletes (baseball, football, soccer, basketball, and cycling) "compared to age and sex-matched controls from the general population and other athletes." The span longevities were influenced by factors like the type of sport, the playing position, the race, and the energy system.

=== International level ===
An observational study held from professional footballers -active (during their career) and recently retired (post-career, aged more than 45 years)- in 70 countries between 2007 and 2013, elaborated on data from the World Footballers' Union (FIFPro), recorded 214 deaths of which 25% was caused by accidents, 11% by suicides and 33% by a suspected cardiac pathology (on an overall 55% of deaths caused by some sort of disease).

Clinical evaluation, ECG, and echocardiography are required for the athletes as pre-participation tools in order to prevent sudden cardiac deaths in people aged less than 35. To evaluate the risk of myocardial fibrosis, may use and recommend the additional use of late gadolinium enhancement (LGE) with pre- and post-contrast and extracellular volume fraction (ECV) images. Even encouraged, it wasn't yet made mandatory.

=== North America ===
In 2015, 205 deaths among North American professional athletes who were registered as active at the time of their decease were analysed. Data were collected for the four major sports: National Basketball Association (NBA), National Football League (NFL), National Hockey League (NHL), and Major League Baseball (MLB). The NFL and NBA active players had "a higher likelihood of dying in a car accident" and a significantly higher likelihood of dying from a cardiac-related illness compared to the NHL and MLB active populations.

In 2013, a study on 3,439 retired athletes of the National Football Leagues with at least five credited playing seasons between 1959 and 1988 did not show a statistical correlation between suicide mortality and professional activity, particularly football-related compared with the general control sample. No stratification was reported between speed and non-speed position players.

=== Italy ===
Until the 2000s a very limited number of formal studies has been published on mortality from all causes in soccer players, despite the high interest of the public to the matter. An extended study held in Italy between 1975 and 2003 on a total of 5.389 players, aged 14–35 years, highlighted that, while the mortality for cancer and cardiovascular diseases among the football players cohort was significantly lower than the general Italian population, the "mortality rates for amyotrophic lateral sclerosis and car accidents were significantly higher than expected, and for ALS the risk is 18 times than expected."

== Lists of players ==
- Lists of association football players
- Lists of American football players
- List of Gaelic footballers

== See also ==
- Utility player
