= Princ Çali =

Albanian footballer

Personal information
- Date of birth: 29 August 1994 (age 32)
- Place of birth: Tirana, Albania
- Height: 1.87 m (6 ft 2 in)
- Position: Goalkeeper

Team information
- Current team: Luzi
- Number: 1

Youth career
- –2013: Tirana

Senior career*
Years	Team	Apps	(Gls)
2012–2013	Tirana	0	(0)
2013–2015	Kastrioti	11	(0)
2015–2016	Adriatiku	5	(0)
2016–2017	Kastrioti	0	(0)
2017–2019	Tirana	0	(0)
2019–2020	Besa Kavajë	4	(0)
2021–	Luzi	17	(0)
- * Club domestic league appearances and goals as of 19:58, 21 September 2021 (UTC)

Princ Çali (born 29 August 1994) is an Albanian footballer who currently plays as a goalkeeper for KF Luzi i Vogël 2008 in the Kategoria e Dytë.

== Early life ==
He trained in the Italian city of Bari at the age of 17 and, upon return to Albania, was discovered by Agustin Kola, a former international footballer for Albania.

== Honours ==
=== Club ===
Tirana

- Albanian Supercup: (1) 2017
