= Lists of association football players =

Lists of association football players may refer to:

- Lists of men's association football players
- Lists of women's association football players
