= Gustavo Perla =

Uruguayan footballer (born 1978)

Gustavo José Perla (born 3 May 1978 in Montevideo, Uruguay) is a Uruguayan former footballer who played for clubs of Uruguay, Argentina and Chile.

== Teams ==
- Colón FC 1996–1998 (Uruguay)
- Deportivo Maldonado 1999–2007 (Uruguay)
- Juventud de Pergamino 2007 (Argentina)
- Arturo Fernández Vial 2008–2009 (Chile)

== See also ==
- Lists of men's association football players
- List of people from Montevideo
