= Magnetic resonance imaging =

Medical imaging technique

- Para-sagittal MRI of the head, with aliasing artifacts (nose and forehead appear at the back of the head)
- Synonyms: Nuclear magnetic resonance imaging (NMRI), magnetic resonance tomography (MRT)
- ICD-9-CM: 88.91
- MeSH: D008279
- MedlinePlus: 003335

Magnetic resonance imaging (MRI) is a medical imaging technique used in radiology to generate pictures of the anatomy and the physiological processes inside the body. MRI scanners use strong magnetic fields, magnetic field gradients, and radio waves to form images of the organs in the body. MRI does not involve X-rays or the use of ionizing radiation, which distinguishes it from computed tomography (CT) and positron emission tomography (PET) scans. MRI is a medical application of nuclear magnetic resonance (NMR), which can also be used for imaging in other NMR applications, such as NMR spectroscopy.

MRI is widely used in hospitals and clinics for medical diagnosis, staging and follow-up of disease. In the early 1970s, it was demonstrated by Ray Damadian, Carlton Hazlewood and Donald Chang that measurement of NMR relaxation times can be used to detect cancer. Soon after that, Paul Lauterbur proposed to use a magnetic field gradient to generate the NMR image in a 2-D plane. Compared to CT, MRI provides better contrast in images of soft tissues, e.g. in the brain or abdomen. However, it may be perceived as less comfortable by patients, due to the usually longer and louder measurements with the subject in a long, confining tube, although "open" MRI designs mostly relieve this. Additionally, implants and other non-removable metal in the body can pose a risk and may exclude some patients from undergoing an MRI examination safely.

MRI was originally called NMRI (nuclear magnetic resonance imaging), but "nuclear" was dropped to avoid negative associations. Certain atomic nuclei are able to absorb radio frequency (RF) energy when placed in an external magnetic field; the resultant evolving spin polarization can induce an RF signal in a radio frequency coil and thereby be detected. In other words, the nuclear magnetic spin of protons in the hydrogen nuclei resonates with the RF incident waves and emit coherent radiation with compact direction, energy (frequency) and phase. This coherent amplified radiation is then detected by RF antennas close to the subject being examined. It is a process similar to masers. In clinical and research MRI, hydrogen atoms are most often used to generate a macroscopic polarized radiation that is detected by the antennas. Hydrogen atoms are naturally abundant in humans and other biological organisms, particularly in water and fat. For this reason, most MRI scans essentially map the location of water and fat in the body. Pulses of radio waves excite the nuclear spin energy transition, and magnetic field gradients localize the polarization in space. By varying the parameters of the pulse sequence, different contrasts may be generated between tissues based on the relaxation properties of the hydrogen atoms therein.

Since its development in the 1970s and 1980s, MRI has proven to be a versatile imaging technique. While MRI is most prominently used in diagnostic medicine and biomedical research, it also may be used to form images of non-living objects, such as mummies. Diffusion MRI and functional MRI extend the utility of MRI to capture neuronal tracts and blood flow respectively in the nervous system, in addition to detailed spatial images. The sustained increase in demand for MRI within health systems has led to concerns about cost effectiveness and overdiagnosis.

== Mechanism ==
=== Construction and physics ===
Schematic of a cylindrical superconducting MR scanner. Top: cross section of the cylinder with primary coil, gradient coils and RF transmit coils. Bottom: longitudinal section of the cylinder and table, showing the same coils and the RF receive coil.

The major components of an MRI scanner are the main magnet, which polarizes the sample, the shim coils for correcting shifts in the homogeneity of the main magnetic field, the gradient system which is used to localize the region to be scanned and the RF system, which excites the sample and detects the resulting NMR signal. The whole system is controlled by one or more computers.

In most medical applications, hydrogen nuclei, which consist solely of a proton, that are in tissues create a signal that is processed to form an image of the body in terms of the density of those nuclei in a specific region. Given that the protons are affected by fields from other atoms to which they are bonded, it is possible to separate responses from hydrogen in specific compounds. To perform a study, the person is positioned within an MRI scanner that forms a strong magnetic field around the area to be imaged. First, energy from an oscillating magnetic field is temporarily applied to the patient at the appropriate resonance frequency. Scanning with X and Y gradient coils causes a selected region of the patient to experience the exact magnetic field required for the energy to be absorbed. The atoms are excited by a RF pulse and the resultant signal is measured by one or more receiving coils. The RF signal may be processed to deduce position information by looking at the changes in RF level and phase caused by varying the local magnetic field using gradient coils. As these coils are rapidly switched during the excitation and response to perform a moving line scan, they create the characteristic repetitive noise of an MRI scan as the windings move slightly due to magnetostriction. The contrast between different tissues is determined by the rate at which excited atoms return to the equilibrium state. Exogenous contrast agents may be given to the person to make the image clearer.

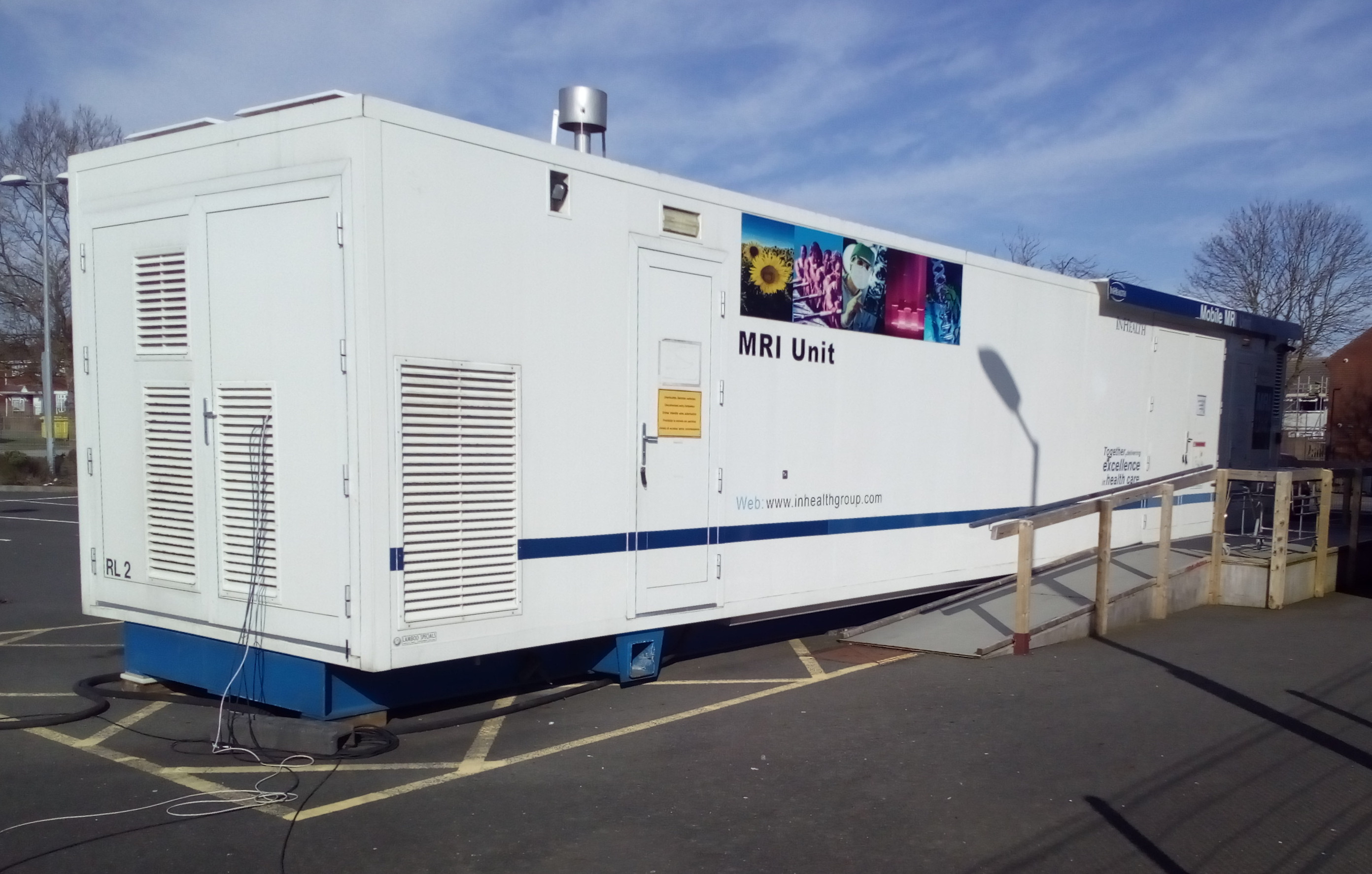
A mobile MRI unit

Audio recording
A short extract of a 20-minute scanning session, recorded outside the above unit

MRI requires a magnetic field that is both strong and uniform to a few parts per million across the scan volume. The field strength of the magnet is measured in teslas – and while the majority of systems operate at 1.5 T, commercial systems are available between 0.2 and 7 T. 3T MRI systems, also called 3 Tesla MRIs, have stronger magnets than 1.5 systems and are considered better for images of organs and soft tissue. Whole-body MRI systems for research applications operate in e.g. 9.4T, 10.5T, 11.7T. Even higher field whole-body MRI systems e.g. 14 T and beyond are in conceptual proposal or in engineering design. Most clinical magnets are superconducting magnets, which require liquid helium to keep them at low temperatures. Lower field strengths can be achieved with permanent magnets, which are often used in "open" MRI scanners for claustrophobic patients. Lower field strengths are also used in a portable MRI scanner approved by the FDA in 2020. Recently, MRI has been demonstrated also at ultra-low fields, i.e., in the microtesla-to-millitesla range, where sufficient signal quality is made possible by prepolarization (on the order of 10–100 mT) and by measuring the Larmor precession fields at about 100 microtesla with highly sensitive superconducting quantum interference devices (SQUIDs).

=== T1 and T2 ===
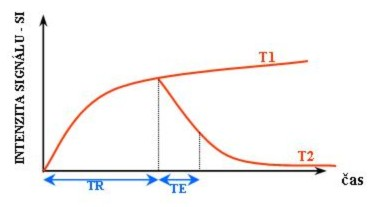
Effects of TR and TE on MR signal

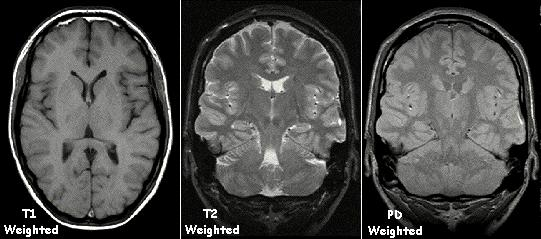
Examples of T1-weighted, T2-weighted and PD-weighted MRI scans

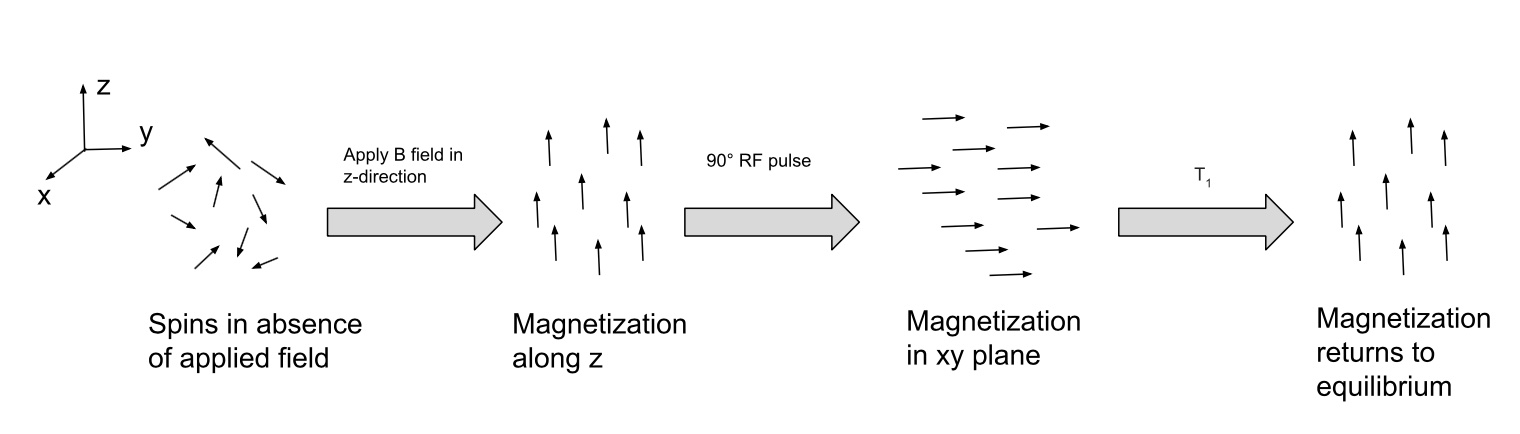
Diagram of changing magnetization and spin orientations throughout spin-lattice relaxation experiment

Each tissue returns to its equilibrium state after excitation by the independent relaxation processes of T_{1} (spin-lattice; that is, magnetization in the same direction as the static magnetic field) and T_{2} (spin–spin; transverse to the static magnetic field). To create a T_{1}-weighted image, magnetization is allowed to recover before measuring the MR signal by changing the repetition time (TR). This image weighting is useful for assessing the cerebral cortex, identifying fatty tissue, characterizing focal liver lesions, and in general, obtaining morphological information, as well as for post-contrast imaging. To create a T_{2}-weighted image, magnetization is allowed to decay before measuring the MR signal by changing the echo time (TE). This image weighting is useful for detecting edema and inflammation, revealing white matter lesions, and assessing zonal anatomy in the prostate and uterus.

The information from MRI scans comes in the form of image contrasts based on differences in the rate of relaxation of nuclear spins following their perturbation by an oscillating magnetic field (in the form of radiofrequency pulses through the sample). The relaxation rates are a measure of the time it takes for a signal to decay back to an equilibrium state from either the longitudinal or transverse plane.

Magnetization builds up along the z-axis in the presence of a magnetic field, B_{0}, such that the magnetic dipoles in the sample will, on average, align with the z-axis summing to a total magnetization M_{z}. This magnetization along z is defined as the equilibrium magnetization; magnetization is defined as the sum of all magnetic dipoles in a sample. Following the equilibrium magnetization, a 90° radiofrequency (RF) pulse flips the direction of the magnetization vector in the xy-plane, and is then switched off. The initial magnetic field B_{0}, however, is still applied. Thus, the spin magnetization vector will slowly return from the xy-plane back to the equilibrium state. The time it takes for the magnetization vector to return to its equilibrium value, M_{z}, is referred to as the longitudinal relaxation time, T_{1}. Subsequently, the rate at which this happens is simply the reciprocal of the relaxation time: $\frac {1}{T_1} = R_1$. Similarly, the time in which it takes for M_{xy} to return to zero is T_{2}, with the rate $\frac {1}{T_2} = R_2$. Magnetization as a function of time is defined by the Bloch equations.

T_{1} and T_{2} values are dependent on the chemical environment of the sample; hence their utility in MRI. Soft tissue and muscle tissue relax at different rates, yielding the image contrast in a typical scan.

The standard display of MR images is to represent fluid characteristics in black-and-white images, where different tissues turn out as follows:

Signals from different materials
Signal	T1-weighted	T2-weighted
High	Fat; Subacute hemorrhage; Melanin; Protein-rich fluid; Slowly flowing blood; Paramagnetic or diamagnetic substances, such as gadolinium, manganese, copper; Cortical pseudolaminar necrosis; Anatomy	Fat; More water content, as in edema, tumor, infarction, inflammation and infection; Extracellularly located methemoglobin in subacute hemorrhage; Pathology
Intermediate	Gray matter darker than white matter	White matter darker than grey matter
Low	Bone; Air; Low proton density as in calcification; Urine; CSF; More water content, as in edema, tumor, infarction, inflammation, infection, hyperacute or chronic hemorrhage	Bone; Air; Low proton density, as in calcification and fibrosis; Paramagnetic material, such as deoxyhemoglobin, intracellular methemoglobin, iron, ferritin, hemosiderin, melanin; Protein-rich fluid

== Diagnostics ==
=== Usage by organ or system ===
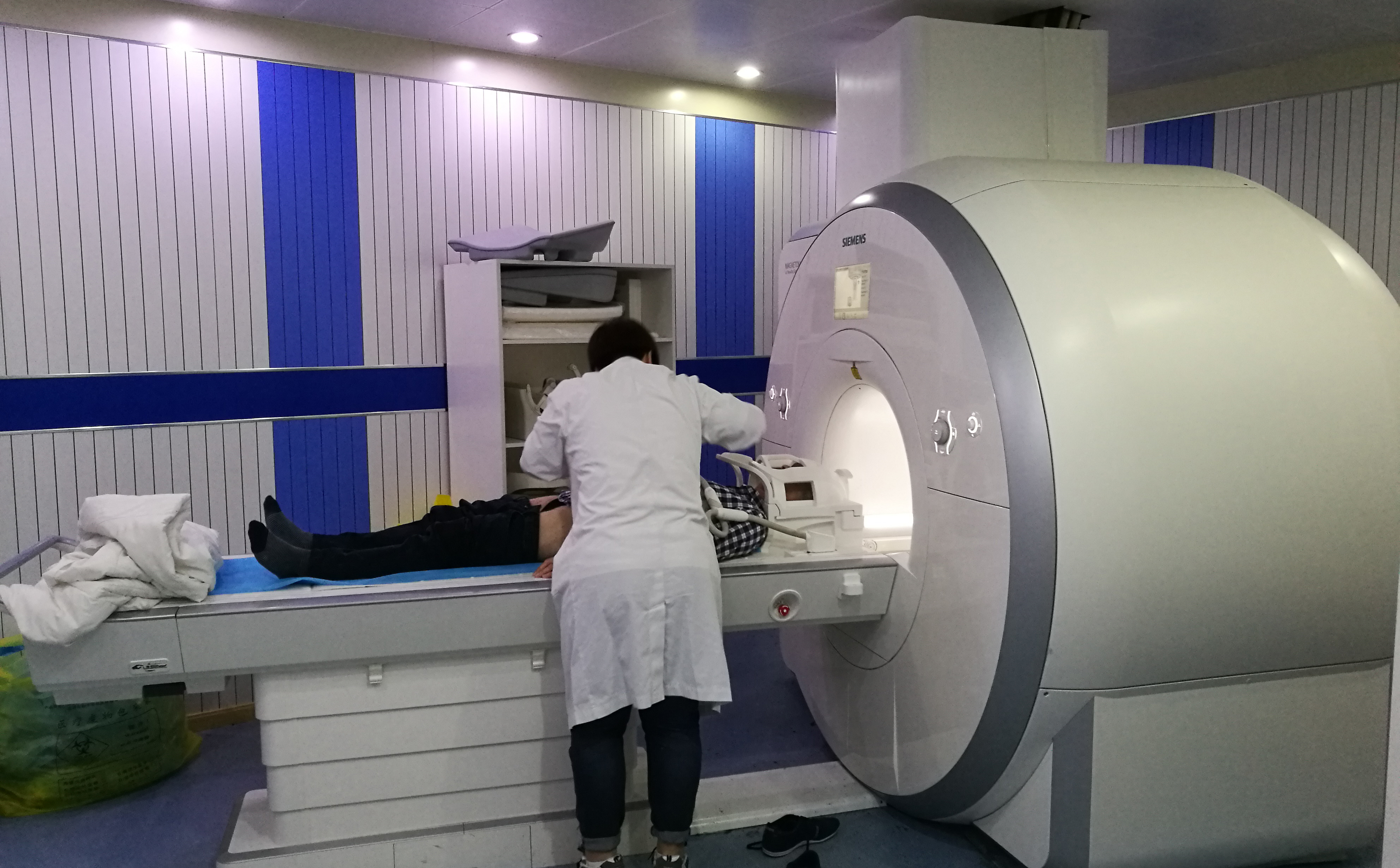
Patient being positioned for MR study of the head and abdomen

MRI has a wide range of applications in medical diagnosis and around 50,000 scanners are estimated to be in use worldwide. MRI affects diagnosis and treatment in many specialties although the effect on improved health outcomes is disputed in certain cases.

MRI is the investigation of choice in the preoperative staging of rectal and prostate cancer and has a role in the diagnosis, staging, and follow-up of other tumors, as well as for determining areas of tissue for sampling in biobanking.

==== Neuroimaging ====
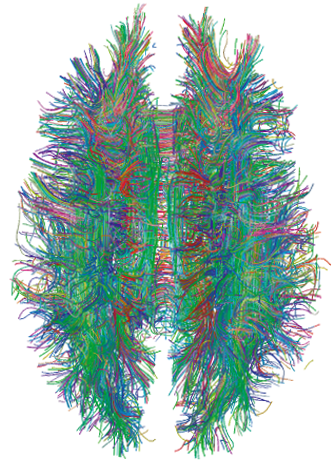
MRI diffusion tensor imaging of white matter tracts

MRI is the investigative tool of choice for neurological cancers over CT, as it offers better visualization of the posterior cranial fossa, containing the brainstem and the cerebellum. The contrast provided between grey and white matter makes MRI the best choice for many conditions of the central nervous system, including demyelinating diseases, dementia, cerebrovascular disease, infectious diseases, Alzheimer's disease and epilepsy. MRI also is used in guided stereotactic surgery and radiosurgery for treatment of intracranial tumors, arteriovenous malformations, and other surgically treatable conditions using a device known as the N-localizer. New tools that implement artificial intelligence in healthcare have demonstrated higher image quality and morphometric analysis in neuroimaging with the application of a denoising system. More broadly, deep learning has been applied to accelerate MRI acquisition itself by reconstructing diagnostic-quality images from undersampled k-space data. The fastMRI project, a collaboration between Meta AI Research (FAIR) and NYU Langone Health launched in 2018, released the largest open-source dataset of raw MRI measurements and demonstrated that AI-based reconstruction can achieve up to 4× acceleration of knee and brain scans with no loss of diagnostic accuracy—a result confirmed in a clinical interchangeability study. These methods have since been adopted as a clinical standard for accelerated MRI at several major medical centers.

The record for the highest spatial resolution of a whole intact brain (postmortem) is 100 microns, from Massachusetts General Hospital. The data was published in Nature in October 2019.

Though MRI is used widely in research on mental disabilities, based on a 2024 systematic literature review and meta analysis commissioned by the Patient-Centered Outcomes Research Institute (PCORI), available research using MRI scans to diagnose ADHD showed great variability. The authors conclude that MRI cannot be reliably used to assist in making a clinical diagnosis of ADHD.

==== Cardiovascular ====
MR angiogram in congenital heart disease

Cardiac MRI is complementary to other imaging techniques, such as echocardiography, cardiac CT, and nuclear medicine. It can be used to assess the structure and the function of the heart. Its applications include assessment of myocardial ischemia and viability, cardiomyopathies, myocarditis, iron overload, vascular diseases, and congenital heart disease.

==== Musculoskeletal ====
Applications in the musculoskeletal system include spinal imaging, assessment of joint disease, and soft tissue tumors. MRI techniques can also be used for diagnostic imaging of systemic muscle diseases including genetic muscle diseases.

Swallowing movements of the throat and esophagus can cause motion artifacts over the imaged spine. Therefore, a saturation pulse applied over this region can help to avoid these artifacts. Motion artifacts arising due to the pumping of the heart can be reduced by timing the MRI pulse according to heart cycles. Blood vessel flow artifacts can be reduced by applying saturation pulses above and below the region of interest.

==== Liver and gastrointestinal ====
Hepatobiliary MRI is used to detect and characterize lesions of the liver, pancreas, and bile ducts. Focal or diffuse disorders of the liver may be evaluated using diffusion-weighted, opposed-phase imaging and dynamic contrast enhancement sequences. Extracellular contrast agents are used widely in hepatograms, and newer hepatobiliary contrast agents also provide the opportunity to perform functional biliary imaging. Anatomical imaging of the bile ducts is achieved by using a heavily T2-weighted sequence in magnetic resonance cholangiopancreatography (MRCP). Functional imaging of the pancreas is performed following administration of secretin. MR enterography provides non-invasive assessment of inflammatory bowel disease and small bowel tumors. MR-colonography may play a role in the detection of large polyps in patients at increased risk of colorectal cancer.

==== Angiography ====
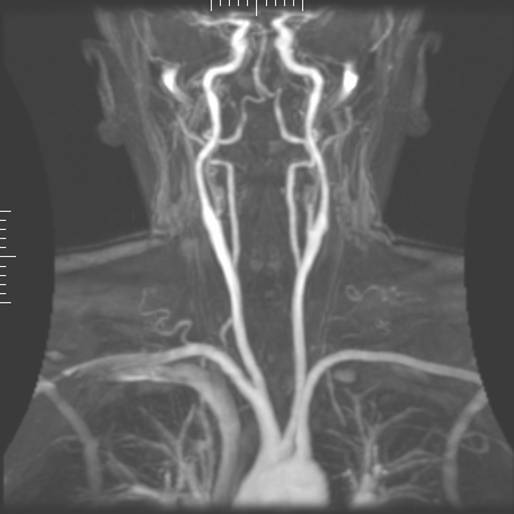
Magnetic resonance angiography

Magnetic resonance angiography (MRA) generates pictures of the arteries to evaluate them for stenosis (abnormal narrowing) or aneurysms (vessel wall dilatations, at risk of rupture). MRA is often used to evaluate the arteries of the neck and brain, the thoracic and abdominal aorta, the renal arteries, and the legs (called a "run-off"). A variety of techniques can be used to generate the pictures, such as administration of a paramagnetic contrast agent (gadolinium) or using a technique known as "flow-related enhancement" (e.g., 2D and 3D time-of-flight sequences), where most of the signal on an image is due to blood that recently moved into that plane (see also FLASH MRI).

Techniques involving phase accumulation (known as phase contrast angiography) can also be used to generate flow velocity maps easily and accurately. Magnetic resonance venography (MRV) is a similar procedure that is used to image veins. In this method, the tissue is now excited inferiorly, while the signal is gathered in the plane immediately superior to the excitation plane—thus imaging the venous blood that recently moved from the excited plane.

== Contrast agents ==
MRI for imaging anatomical structures or blood flow do not require contrast agents since the varying properties of the tissues or blood provide natural contrasts. However, for more specific types of imaging, exogenous contrast agents may be given intravenously, orally, or intra-articularly. Most contrast agents are either paramagnetic (e.g.: gadolinium, manganese, europium), and are used to shorten T1 in the tissue they accumulate in, or super-paramagnetic (SPIONs), and are used to shorten T2 and T2* in healthy tissue reducing its signal intensity (negative contrast agents). The most commonly used intravenous contrast agents are based on chelates of gadolinium, which is highly paramagnetic. In general, these agents have proved safer than the iodinated contrast agents used in X-ray radiography or CT. Anaphylactoid reactions are rare, occurring in approx. 0.03–0.1%. Of particular interest is the lower incidence of nephrotoxicity, compared with iodinated agents, when given at usual doses—this has made contrast-enhanced MRI scanning an option for patients with renal impairment, who would otherwise not be able to undergo contrast-enhanced CT.

Gadolinium-based contrast reagents are typically octadentate complexes of gadolinium(III). The complex is very stable (log K > 20) so that, in use, the concentration of the un-complexed Gd^{3+} ions should be below the toxicity limit. The 9th place in the metal ion's coordination sphere is occupied by a water molecule which exchanges rapidly with water molecules in the reagent molecule's immediate environment, affecting the magnetic resonance relaxation time.

In December 2017, the Food and Drug Administration (FDA) in the United States announced in a drug safety communication that new warnings were to be included on all gadolinium-based contrast agents (GBCAs). The FDA also called for increased patient education and requiring gadolinium contrast vendors to conduct additional animal and clinical studies to assess the safety of these agents. Although gadolinium agents have proved useful for patients with kidney impairment, in patients with severe kidney failure requiring dialysis there is a risk of a rare but serious illness, nephrogenic systemic fibrosis, which may be linked to the use of certain gadolinium-containing agents. The most frequently linked is gadodiamide, but other agents have been linked too. Although a causal link has not been definitively established, current guidelines in the United States are that dialysis patients should only receive gadolinium agents where essential and that dialysis should be performed as soon as possible after the scan to remove the agent from the body promptly.

In Europe, where more gadolinium-containing agents are available, a classification of agents according to potential risks has been released. In 2008, a new contrast agent named gadoxetate, brand name Eovist (US) or Primovist (EU), was approved for diagnostic use: This has the theoretical benefit of a dual excretion path.

== Sequences ==
An MRI sequence is a particular setting of radiofrequency pulses and gradients, resulting in a particular image appearance. The T1 and T2 weighting can also be described as MRI sequences.

==== Overview table ====
This table does not include uncommon and experimental sequences.

Group	Sequence	Abbr.	Physics	Main clinical distinctions	Example
Spin echo	T1 weighted	T1	Measuring spin–lattice relaxation by using a short repetition time (TR) and echo time (TE).	Lower signal for more water content, as in edema, tumor, infarction, inflammation, infection, hyperacute or chronic hemorrhage.; High signal for fat; High signal for paramagnetic substances, such as MRI contrast agents; Standard foundation and comparison for other sequences	
Spin echo	T2 weighted	T2	Measuring spin–spin relaxation by using long TR and TE times	Higher signal for more water content; Low signal for fat in standard Spine Echo (SE), though not with Fast Spin Echo/Turbo Spin Echo (FSE/TSE). FSE/TSE is the standard of care in modern medicine because it is faster. With FSE/TSE, fat has high signal due to disruption of hyperfine J-coupling between adjacent fat protons.; Low signal for paramagnetic substances; Standard foundation and comparison for other sequences	
Spin echo	Proton density weighted	PD	Long TR (to reduce T1) and short TE (to minimize T2).	Joint disease and injury.: High signal from meniscus tears. (pictured)	
Gradient echo (GRE)	Steady-state free precession	SSFP	Maintenance of a steady, residual transverse magnetisation over successive cycles.	Creation of cardiac MRI videos (pictured).	
Gradient echo (GRE)	Effective T2 or "T2-star"	T2*	Spoiled gradient recalled echo (GRE) with a long echo time and small flip angle	Low signal from hemosiderin deposits (pictured) and hemorrhages.	
Gradient echo (GRE)	Susceptibility-weighted	SWI	Spoiled gradient recalled echo (GRE), fully flow compensated, long echo time, combines phase image with magnitude image	Detecting small amounts of hemorrhage (diffuse axonal injury pictured) or calcium.	
Inversion recovery	Short tau inversion recovery	STIR	Fat suppression by setting an inversion time where the signal of fat is zero.	High signal in edema, such as in more severe stress fracture. Shin splints pictured:	
Inversion recovery	Fluid-attenuated inversion recovery	FLAIR	Fluid suppression by setting an inversion time that nulls fluids	High signal in lacunar infarction, multiple sclerosis (MS) plaques, subarachnoid haemorrhage and meningitis (pictured).	
Inversion recovery	Double inversion recovery	DIR	Simultaneous suppression of cerebrospinal fluid and white matter by two inversion times.	High signal of multiple sclerosis plaques (pictured).	
Diffusion weighted (DWI)	Conventional	DWI	Measure of Brownian motion of water molecules.	High signal within minutes of cerebral infarction (pictured).	
Diffusion weighted (DWI)	Apparent diffusion coefficient	ADC	Reduced T2 weighting by taking multiple conventional DWI images with different DWI weighting, and the change corresponds to diffusion.	Low signal minutes after cerebral infarction (pictured).	
Diffusion weighted (DWI)	Diffusion tensor	DTI	Mainly tractography (pictured) by an overall greater Brownian motion of water molecules in the directions of nerve fibers.	Evaluating white matter deformation by tumors; Reduced fractional anisotropy may indicate dementia.	
Perfusion weighted (PWI)	Dynamic susceptibility contrast	DSC	Measures changes over time in susceptibility-induced signal loss due to gadolinium contrast injection.	Provides measurements of blood flow; In cerebral infarction, the infarcted core and the penumbra have decreased perfusion and delayed contrast arrival (pictured).	
Perfusion weighted (PWI)	Arterial spin labelling	ASL	Magnetic labeling of arterial blood below the imaging slab, which subsequently enters the region of interest. It does not need gadolinium contrast.	Provides measurements of blood flow; In cerebral infarction, the infarcted core and the penumbra have decreased perfusion and delayed contrast arrival (pictured).	
Perfusion weighted (PWI)	Dynamic contrast enhanced	DCE	Measures changes over time in the shortening of the spin–lattice relaxation (T1) induced by a gadolinium contrast bolus.	Faster Gd contrast uptake along with other features is suggestive of malignancy (pictured).	
Functional MRI (fMRI)	Blood-oxygen-level dependent imaging	BOLD	Changes in oxygen saturation-dependent magnetism of hemoglobin reflects tissue activity.	Localizing brain activity from performing an assigned task (e.g. talking, moving fingers) before surgery, also used in research of cognition.	
Magnetic resonance angiography (MRA) and venography	Time-of-flight	TOF	Blood entering the imaged area is not yet magnetically saturated, giving it a much higher signal when using short echo time and flow compensation.	Detection of aneurysm, stenosis, or dissection	
Magnetic resonance angiography (MRA) and venography	Phase-contrast magnetic resonance imaging	PC-MRA	Two gradients with equal magnitude, but opposite direction, are used to encode a phase shift, which is proportional to the velocity of spins.	Detection of aneurysm, stenosis, or dissection (pictured).	(VIPR)

== Specialized configurations ==
=== Magnetic resonance spectroscopy ===
Magnetic resonance spectroscopy (MRS) is used to measure the levels of different metabolites in body tissues, which can be achieved through a variety of single voxel or imaging-based techniques. The MR signal produces a spectrum of resonances that corresponds to different molecular arrangements of the isotope being "excited". This signature is used to diagnose certain metabolic disorders, especially those affecting the brain, and to provide information on tumor metabolism.

Magnetic resonance spectroscopic imaging (MRSI) combines both spectroscopic and imaging methods to produce spatially localized spectra from within the sample or patient. The spatial resolution is much lower (limited by the available SNR), but the spectra in each voxel contains information about many metabolites. Because the available signal is used to encode spatial and spectral information, MRSI requires high SNR achievable only at higher field strengths (3 T and above). The high procurement and maintenance costs of MRI with extremely high field strengths inhibit their popularity. However, recent compressed sensing-based software algorithms (e.g., SAMV) have been proposed to achieve super-resolution without requiring such high field strengths.

=== Real-time ===
Real-time MRI of a human heart at a resolution of 50 ms

Real-time MRI of a human heart (2-chamber view) at 22 ms resolution

Real-time MRI of a vocal tract while singing, at 40 ms resolution

Real-time magnetic resonance imaging (RT-MRI) refers to the continuous monitoring of moving objects in real time. Traditionally, real-time MRI was possible only with low image quality or low temporal resolution. An iterative reconstruction algorithm removed limitations. Radial FLASH MRI (real-time) yields a temporal resolution of 20 to 30 milliseconds for images with an in-plane resolution of 1.5 to 2.0 mm. Real-time MRI adds information about diseases of the joints and the heart. In many cases MRI examinations become easier and more comfortable for patients, especially for the patients who cannot calm their breathing or who have arrhythmia.

Balanced steady-state free precession (bSSFP) imaging gives better image contrast between the blood pool and myocardium than FLASH MRI, at the cost of severe banding artifact when B0 inhomogeneity is strong.

=== Interventional MRI ===
The lack of harmful effects on the patient and the operator make MRI well-suited for interventional radiology, where the images produced by an MRI scanner guide minimally invasive procedures. Such procedures use no ferromagnetic instruments.

A specialized growing subset of interventional MRI is intraoperative MRI, in which an MRI is used in surgery. Some specialized MRI systems allow imaging concurrent with the surgical procedure. More typically, the surgical procedure is temporarily interrupted so that MRI can assess the success of the procedure or guide subsequent surgical work.

=== Magnetic resonance guided focused ultrasound ===
In guided therapy, high-intensity focused ultrasound (HIFU) beams are focused on a tissue, that are controlled using MR thermal imaging. Due to the high energy at the focus, the temperature rises to above 65 °C (150 °F) which completely destroys the tissue. This technology can achieve precise ablation of diseased tissue. MR imaging provides a three-dimensional view of the target tissue, allowing for the precise focusing of ultrasound energy. The MR imaging provides quantitative, real-time, thermal images of the treated area. This allows the physician to ensure that the temperature generated during each cycle of ultrasound energy is sufficient to cause thermal ablation within the desired tissue and if not, to adapt the parameters to ensure effective treatment.

=== Multinuclear imaging ===
Hydrogen has the most frequently imaged nucleus in MRI because it is present in biological tissues in great abundance, and because its high gyromagnetic ratio gives a strong signal. However, any nucleus with a net nuclear spin could potentially be imaged with MRI. Such nuclei include deuterium, helium-3, lithium-7, carbon-13, fluorine-19, oxygen-17, sodium-23, phosphorus-31 and xenon-129. ^{2}H, ^{23}Na and ^{31}P are naturally abundant in the body, so they can be imaged directly. Naturally abundant deuterium at the concentration of around 15mM can be imaged, but suffers from low gamma sensitivity and quadripolar Relaxation (NMR). Deuterium imaging however has a sparse chemical shift spectrum making it possible to develop tailored multiband selective RF pulses for metabolite selective imaging. Thus, metabolic imaging, similar to what's done with Carbon-13 is possible with Deuterium metabolic imaging (DMI) for insights into vivo metabolic processes. As well, the short T2 of deuterium allows it to be signal averaged rapidly, making up for some of its physical shortcomings. Gaseous isotopes such as ^{3}He or ^{129}Xe must be hyperpolarized and then inhaled as their nuclear density is too low to yield a useful signal under normal conditions. ^{17}O and ^{19}F can be administered in sufficient quantities in liquid form (e.g. ^{17}O-water) that hyperpolarization is not a necessity. Using helium or xenon has the advantage of reduced background noise, and therefore increased contrast for the image itself, because these elements are not normally present in biological tissues.

Moreover, the nucleus of any atom that has a net nuclear spin and that is bonded to a hydrogen atom could potentially be imaged via heteronuclear magnetization transfer MRI that would image the high-gyromagnetic-ratio hydrogen nucleus instead of the low-gyromagnetic-ratio nucleus that is bonded to the hydrogen atom. In principle, heteronuclear magnetization transfer MRI could be used to detect the presence or absence of specific chemical bonds.

Multinuclear imaging is primarily a research technique at present. However, potential applications include functional imaging and imaging of organs poorly seen on ^{1}H MRI (e.g., lungs and bones) or as alternative contrast agents. Inhaled hyperpolarized ^{3}He can be used to image the distribution of air spaces within the lungs. Injectable solutions containing ^{13}C or stabilized bubbles of hyperpolarized ^{129}Xe have been studied as contrast agents for angiography and perfusion imaging. ^{31}P can potentially provide information on bone density and structure, as well as functional imaging of the brain. Multinuclear imaging holds the potential to chart the distribution of lithium in the human brain, this element finding use as an important drug for those with conditions such as bipolar disorder.

=== Molecular imaging by MRI ===
MRI has the advantages of having very high spatial resolution and is very adept at morphological imaging and functional imaging. MRI does have several disadvantages though. First, MRI has a sensitivity of around 10^{−3} mol/L to 10^{−5} mol/L, which, compared to other types of imaging, can be very limiting. This problem stems from the fact that the population difference between the nuclear spin states is very small at room temperature. For example, at 1.5 teslas, a typical field strength for clinical MRI, the difference between high and low energy states is approximately 9 molecules per 2 million. Improvements to increase MR sensitivity include increasing magnetic field strength and hyperpolarization via optical pumping or dynamic nuclear polarization. There are also a variety of signal amplification schemes based on chemical exchange that increase sensitivity.

To achieve molecular imaging of disease biomarkers using MRI, targeted MRI contrast agents with high specificity and high relaxivity (sensitivity) are required. To date, many studies have been devoted to developing targeted-MRI contrast agents to achieve molecular imaging by MRI. Commonly, peptides, antibodies, or small ligands, and small protein domains, such as HER-2 affibodies, have been applied to achieve targeting. To enhance the sensitivity of the contrast agents, these targeting moieties are usually linked to high payload MRI contrast agents or MRI contrast agents with high relaxivities. A new class of gene targeting MR contrast agents has been introduced to show gene action of unique mRNA and gene transcription factor proteins. These new contrast agents can trace cells with unique mRNA, microRNA and virus; tissue response to inflammation in living brains. The MR reports change in gene expression with positive correlation to TaqMan analysis, optical and electron microscopy.

=== Parallel MRI ===
It takes time to gather MRI data using sequential applications of magnetic field gradients. Even for the most streamlined of MRI sequences, there are physical and physiologic limits to the rate of gradient switching. Parallel MRI circumvents these limits by gathering some portion of the data simultaneously, rather than in a traditional sequential fashion. This is accomplished using arrays of radiofrequency (RF) detector coils, each with a different 'view' of the body. A reduced set of gradient steps is applied, and the remaining spatial information is filled in by combining signals from various coils, based on their known spatial sensitivity patterns. The resulting acceleration is limited by the number of coils and by the signal to noise ratio (which decreases with increasing acceleration), but two- to four-fold accelerations may commonly be achieved with suitable coil array configurations, and substantially higher accelerations have been demonstrated with specialized coil arrays. Parallel MRI may be used with most MRI sequences.

After a number of early suggestions for using arrays of detectors to accelerate imaging went largely unremarked in the MRI field, parallel imaging saw widespread development and application following the introduction of the simultaneous acquisition of spatial harmonics (SMASH) technique in 1996–7. The sensitivity encoding (SENSE) and generalized autocalibrating partially parallel acquisitions (GRAPPA) techniques are the parallel imaging methods in most common use today. The advent of parallel MRI resulted in extensive research and development in image reconstruction and RF coil design, as well as in a rapid expansion of the number of receiver channels available on commercial MR systems. Parallel MRI is now used routinely for MRI examinations in a wide range of body areas and clinical or research applications.

=== Deep learning reconstruction ===
Deep learning approaches extend traditional acceleration methods by training neural networks on large datasets of paired undersampled and fully-sampled MRI scans, enabling image reconstruction at higher acceleration factors than classical parallel imaging alone. Rather than relying on hand-crafted sparsity priors as in compressed sensing, these models learn reconstruction directly from data. One prominent approach, the end-to-end variational network (E2E-VarNet), combines sensitivity map estimation and iterative refinement in a fully learned pipeline, achieving state-of-the-art reconstruction quality on the fastMRI benchmark for both knee and brain MRI..

The fastMRI initiative, a collaboration between Meta AI Research (FAIR) and NYU Langone Health, established the field's primary open benchmark by releasing over 1.5 million raw MRI measurements from knee, brain, and prostate scans in 2018. Annual fastMRI challenges have benchmarked reconstruction quality across international research teams. A clinical interchangeability study confirmed that deep learning reconstruction at 4× acceleration produces images diagnostically equivalent to fully-sampled acquisitions for knee imaging at 3T, and these methods have since been adopted clinically at major medical centers.

=== Quantitative MRI ===
Most MRI focuses on qualitative interpretation of MR data by acquiring spatial maps of relative variations in signal strength which are "weighted" by certain parameters. Quantitative methods instead attempt to determine spatial maps of accurate tissue relaxometry parameter values or magnetic field, or to measure the size of certain spatial features.

Examples of quantitative MRI methods are:

- T1-mapping (notably used in cardiac magnetic resonance imaging)
- T2-mapping
- Quantitative susceptibility mapping (QSM)
- Quantitative fluid flow MRI (i.e. some cerebrospinal fluid flow MRI)
- Magnetic resonance elastography (MRE)
- Magnetic resonance fingerprinting (MRF)

Quantitative MRI aims to increase the reproducibility of MR images and interpretations, but has historically require longer scan times.

Quantitative MRI (or qMRI) sometimes more specifically refers to multi-parametric quantitative MRI, the mapping of multiple tissue relaxometry parameters in a single imaging session. Efforts to make multi-parametric quantitative MRI faster have produced sequences which map multiple parameters simultaneously, either by building separate encoding methods for each parameter into the sequence, or by fitting MR signal evolution to a multi-parameter model.

=== Hyperpolarized gas MRI ===
Traditional MRI generates poor images of lung tissue because there are fewer water molecules with protons that can be excited by the magnetic field. Using hyperpolarized gas an MRI scan can identify ventilation defects in the lungs. Before the scan, a patient is asked to inhale hyperpolarized xenon mixed with a buffer gas of helium or nitrogen. The resulting lung images are much higher quality than with traditional MRI.

== Safety ==
MRI is, in general, a safe technique, although injuries may occur as a result of failed safety procedures or human error. Contraindications to MRI include most cochlear implants and cardiac pacemakers, shrapnel, and metallic foreign bodies in the eyes. Magnetic resonance imaging in pregnancy appears to be safe, at least during the second and third trimesters if done without contrast agents. Since MRI does not use any ionizing radiation, its use is generally favored in preference to CT when either modality could yield the same information. Some patients experience claustrophobia and may require sedation or shorter MRI protocols. Amplitude and rapid switching of gradient coils during image acquisition may cause peripheral nerve stimulation.

External videos
- Magnetic objects thrown at an MRI magnet

MRI uses powerful magnets and can therefore cause magnetic materials to move at great speeds, posing a projectile risk, and may cause fatal accidents. However, as millions of MRIs are performed globally each year, fatalities are extremely rare.

MRI machines can produce loud noise, up to 120 dB(A). This can cause hearing loss, tinnitus and hyperacusis, so appropriate hearing protection is essential for anyone inside the MRI scanner room during the examination.

=== Overuse ===
Medical societies issue guidelines for when physicians should use MRI on patients and recommend against overuse. MRI can detect health problems or confirm a diagnosis, but medical societies often recommend that MRI not be the first procedure for creating a plan to diagnose or manage a patient's complaint. A common case is to use MRI to seek a cause of low back pain; the American College of Physicians, for example, recommends against imaging (including MRI) as unlikely to result in a positive outcome for the patient.

== Artifacts ==
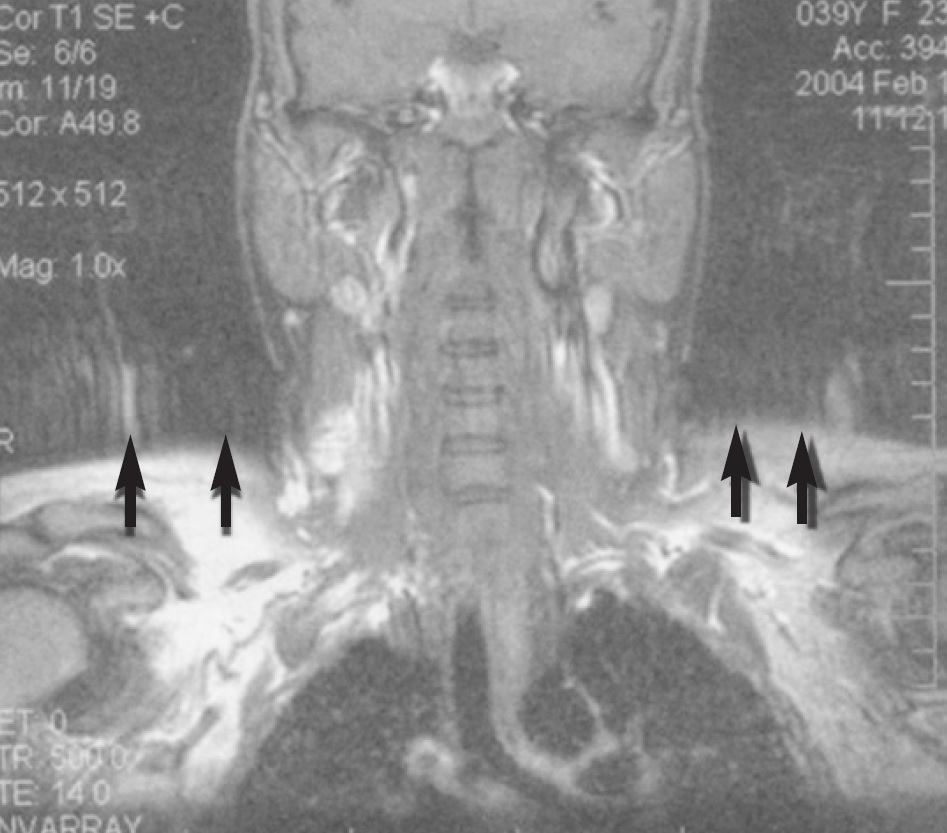
Motion artifact (T1 coronal study of cervical vertebrae)

An MRI artifact is a visual artifact, that is, an anomaly during visual representation. Many different artifacts can occur during magnetic resonance imaging (MRI), some affecting the diagnostic quality, while others may be confused with pathology. Artifacts can be classified as patient-related, signal processing-dependent and hardware (machine)-related.

== Non-medical use ==
MRI is used industrially mainly for routine analysis of chemicals. The nuclear magnetic resonance technique is also used, for example, to measure the ratio between water and fat in foods, monitoring of flow of corrosive fluids in pipes, or to study molecular structures such as catalysts.

Being non-invasive and non-damaging, MRI can be used to study the anatomy of plants, their water transportation processes and water balance. It is also applied to veterinary radiology for diagnostic purposes. Outside this, its use in zoology is limited due to the high cost; but it can be used on many species.

In palaeontology it is used to examine the structure of fossils.

Forensic imaging provides graphic documentation of an autopsy, which manual autopsy does not. CT scanning provides quick whole-body imaging of skeletal and parenchymal alterations, whereas MR imaging gives better representation of soft tissue pathology. All that being said, MRI is more expensive, and more time-consuming to utilize. Moreover, the quality of MR imaging deteriorates below 10 °C.

== History ==
Nuclear Magnetic Resonance (NMR) was invented in the 1940s and 1950s to study physical systems. In the 1970s, several research groups started to use NMR to study biological tissues. Such studies provided the biophysical basis for the development of Magnetic Resonance Imaging (MRI). MRI is based on imaging the relaxation times (or spin diffusion coefficients D) of water protons in biological tissues. Namely, the image contrast in MRI is based on relaxation times (or spin diffusion) differences instead of differences in spin density.

The development of MRI for cancer detection involved three major milestones during the period of 1970–1973:

(1) The study of Carlton Hazlewood and Donald Chang (Baylor College of Medicine and Rice University, 1969–1972): Using rat skeletal muscle and mouse mammary glands, they demonstrated that the NMR relaxation times T1 and T2 differ between cellular water and bulk water. Furthermore, they found that these relaxation times depend directly on the tissue's physiological state. Their findings suggested that NMR can be used to detect cancer. Indeed, using a mouse model of mammary tumor, they showed that T1, T2 and D (spin diffusion coefficient) change progressively during tumor development. An American Physical Society (APS) press release in 1972 highlighted their discovery, which suggested that early development of cancer could be detected using NMR.

(2) The study of Raymond Damadian (New York Downstate Medical Center, 1971-1972): Inspired by Hazlewood and Chang's findings about cellular water relaxation time changes during muscle development, Damadian proposed that T1 is generally longer in tumors compared to normal tissues. He demonstrated this idea with a quick NMR measurement on rat tissues. Damadian also filed a patent in late 1972 for a full-body machine of using NMR to detect cancer.

(3) The study of Paul Lauterbur (The State University of New York at Stony Brook, 1973): Lauterbur proposed to use a magnetic field gradient to conduct a 2-dimensional NMR scan. He called his method zeugmatography. For demonstration, he used CW NMR (not spin-echo) to image the proton spin density in an artificial sample consisting of two tubes of water.

In the late 1970s, physicists Peter Mansfield at the University of Nottingham and Lauterbur developed MRI-related techniques, like the echo-planar imaging (EPI) technique.

Raymond Damadian's work into nuclear magnetic resonance (NMR) has been incorporated into MRI, having built one of the first scanners.

Advances in semiconductor technology were crucial to the development of practical MRI, which requires a large amount of computational power. This was made possible by the rapidly increasing number of transistors on a single integrated circuit chip. Mansfield and Lauterbur were awarded the 2003 Nobel Prize in Physiology or Medicine for their "discoveries concerning magnetic resonance imaging".

== See also ==
- Amplified magnetic resonance imaging
- Cerebrospinal fluid flow MRI
- Electron paramagnetic resonance
- High-definition fiber tracking
- High-resolution computed tomography
- History of neuroimaging
- International Society for Magnetic Resonance in Medicine
- Jemris
- List of neuroimaging software
- Magnetic immunoassay
- Magnetic particle imaging
- Magnetic resonance elastography
- Magnetic Resonance Imaging (journal)
- Magnetic resonance microscopy
- Nobel Prize controversies – Physiology or medicine
- Rabi cycle
- Robinson oscillator
- Sodium MRI
- Virtopsy
