= Hepatogram =

Medical imaging examation of the liver

A hepatogram is a medical imaging examation of the liver. It is done via magnetic resonance imaging and consists of liver fibrosis and inflammation assessment, as well as steatosis grading.

The current imaging protocol for a hepatogram is magnetic resonance elastography for fibrosis and inflammation assessment, and proton density fat fraction for steatosis measurement. A hepatogram is seen as a more accurate and noninvasive alternative to liver biopsy, and has emerged as "the reference standard for non-invasive diagnosis of liver fibrosis". Its main current application is for patients suspected of having non-alcoholic fatty liver disease.
