= High-definition fiber tracking =

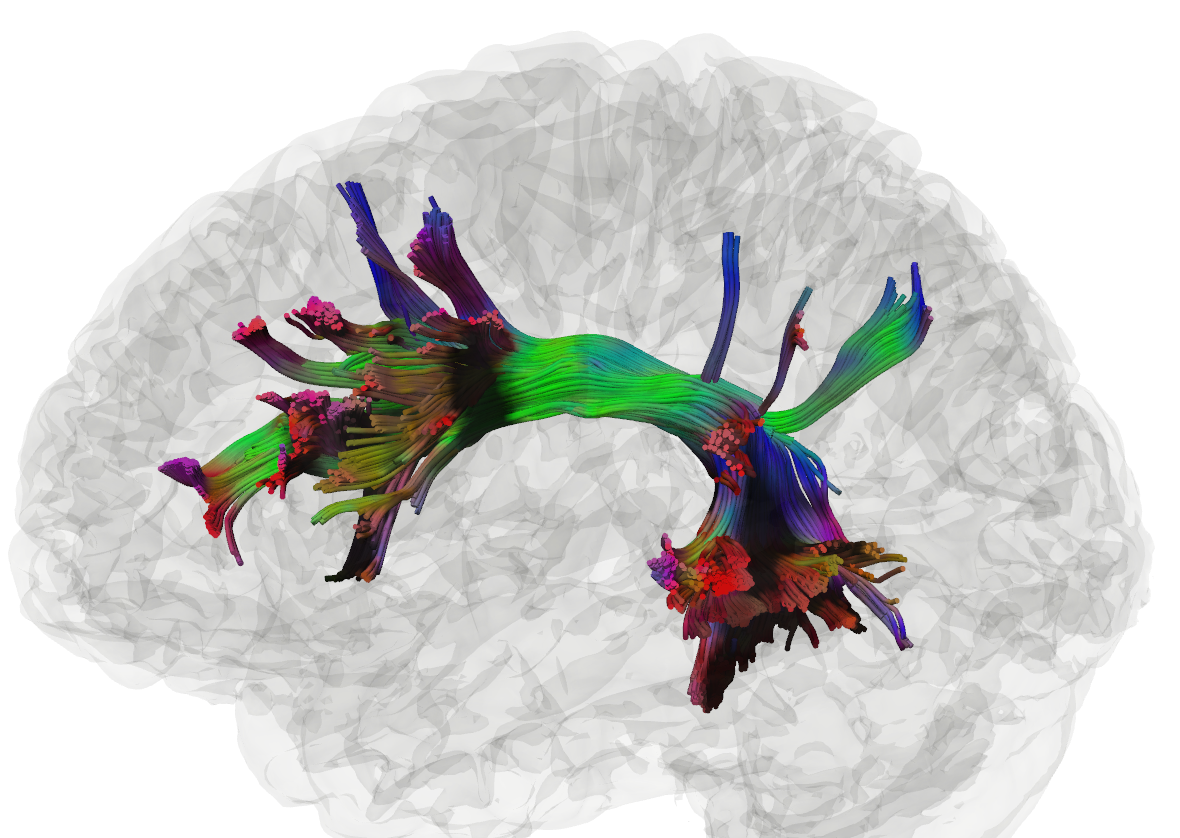
High-definition fiber tracking of arcuate fasciculus

High definition fiber tracking (HDFT) is a tractography technique where data from MRI scanners is processed through computer algorithms to reveal the detailed wiring of the brain and to pinpoint fiber tracts. Each tract contains millions of neuronal connections. HDFT is based on data acquired from diffusion spectrum imaging and processed by generalized q-sampling imaging. The technique makes it possible to virtually dissect 40 major fiber tracts in the brain. The HDFT scan is consistent with brain anatomy unlike diffusion tensor imaging (DTI). Thus, the use of HDFT is essential in pinpointing damaged neural connections.

== History ==
Traditional DTI uses six diffusivity characteristics to model how water molecules diffuse in brain tissues and makes axonal fiber tracking possible. However, DTI had a major limitation in resolving axons from different tracts intersected and crossed en route to their target. In 2009, Learning Research & Development Center (LRDC) at University of Pittsburgh launched the 2009 Pittsburgh Brain Competition to invite the best research team to work on this problem. A prize of $10,000 was offered to the team that could track optic radiations, and teams from 168 countries took part in the competition. A winning team from Taiwan revealed Meyer's loop, which no other team had successfully tracked. The key of the method was multiple observations of water molecules and improved algorithms to better capture how axons connects brain regions. The technique was further developed as HDFT between the University of Pittsburgh and Carnegie Mellon University.

HDFT is currently used by UPMC neurosurgery department to provide neurosurgical planning, neuro-structural damage assessment, intraoperative navigation, and evaluation of changes and responses to rehabilitation therapy after brain surgery.

== Applications ==
HDFT has been applied to traumatic brain injury (TBI) to identify which brain connections have been broken and which are still intact. HDFT allows neurosurgeons to localize fiber breaks caused by traumatic brain injuries to provide better diagnoses and prognoses. It could also provide an objective way of identifying brain injury, predicting outcome and planning rehabilitation. HDFT can also be used to determine the optimal surgical approach for difficult-to-reach tumors and vascular malformations.

== See also ==
- Diffusion MRI (DTI), uses the magnetic properties of water
- Functional magnetic resonance imaging (fMRI), measures blood flow to infer neural activity
