= Jemris =

MRI software

Jemris is an open source MRI sequence design and simulation framework written in C++.

It was designed to most generally and numerically integrate the Bloch equation in a single-core or parallel fashion for protons over a time course of a sequence on almost arbitrary samples with arbitrary excitation and acquisition setup. The integration is performed with the CVODE variable time stepping solver.

Jemris experiment setups are completely managed with XML files. It understands and parses symbolic mathematics as dynamic parameters to allow for maximum flexibility.

It has been used to operate a commercial MRI scanner.
