= Portable magnetic resonance imaging =

Magnetic resonance imaging
- Para-sagittal MRI of the head, with aliasing artifacts (nose and forehead appear at the back of the head)
- Synonyms: Nuclear magnetic resonance imaging (NMRI), magnetic resonance tomography (MRT)
- ICD-9-CM: 88.91
- MeSH: D008279
- MedlinePlus: 003335

Portable magnetic resonance imaging (MRI) is referred to the imaging provided by an MRI scanner that has mobility and portability. It provides MR imaging to the patient in-time and on-site, for example, in intensive care unit (ICU) where there is danger associated with moving the patient, in an ambulance, after a disaster rescue, or in a field hospital/medical tent.

== Superconducting-magnet-based portable MRI ==
The superconducting magnet is one of the main sources to supply a homogeneous main static magnetic field (B0) for MR imaging. Normally it ranges from 1 T to 7 T. To obtain mobility for a conventional MRI scanner that uses a superconducting magnet to supply B0, it is placed in a trailer.

The magnetic field strength of such a mobile MRI scanner is within the range of 1.5 T to 3 T. The weight of the scanner is the same as one sited in a hospital and the price is higher than a traditional one in the hospital, which is due to the mobility added to the scanner. It can be sited by a medical tent by a battlefield.

== Resistive electromagnet-based portable MRI ==
The electromagnet is another source to supply homogeneous B0 for MR imaging. It offers mobility to MRI as electromagnet is relatively light and easier to move around compared to a superconducting magnet. Moreover, an electromagnet does not require a complicated cooling system. Matthew Rosen and his colleagues from Massachusetts General Hospital have developed a 6.5 mT (65 Gauss) electromagnet-based system. The scanner has a 220 cm diameter and is sited in a copper-mesh enclosure where it has been used mostly for human head imaging, although the system was originally designed to perform hyperpolarized 3He lung imaging with subjects in both upright and horizontal orientations. Magritek has a table-top system using an electromagnet to supply B0. The imaging volume is a cylinder with a diameter of 1–2 cm. The downside of using an electromagnet for MRI is the field strength. It is usually below 10 mT if the field of view (FoV) is relatively large, e.g. a diameter of spherical volume (DSV) of 20 cm for head imaging.

== Permanent-magnet-based portable MRI ==
A permanent magnet array (PMA) can supply B0 field for MRI. It does not require power nor a cooling system, which helps to simplify the hardware of a scanner favoring portability. To supply a homogeneous B0 within an FoV of 40–50 cm for a body scan, a PMA, usually in a C-shape or an H-shape, goes up to a room size and is heavy. The field strength is usually below 0.5 T. Siemens has a product, MAGNETOM C, which has a magnetic field of 0.35 T for a body scan. The scanner is a room-sized, 233×206×160 cm, and has a weight of 17.6 tons. Its FoV can go up to 40 cm with a homogeneity of less than 100 ppm. When the concept of body dedication is applied to a PMA-based system where the magnet and other apparatus are built around a targeted body-part under imaging (e.g. the angle, the knee, the shoulder, the arm), the size of the scanner can be reduced to half of a room-size for a homogeneous field for a DSV of around 10–15 cm. A C-shaped PMA was reduced to a table-top size to have a homogeneous field within a DSV of 1–2 cm for imaging

Using a PMA to supply a homogeneous B0 and relying on linear gradient fields supplied by gradient coils cannot give us a PMA with portability and a relatively large imaging volume simultaneously. Allowing magnetic field that has non-linear gradients to encode the signal for imaging leads to the possibility of having a relatively light PMA (tens to hundreds of kgs) and a relatively large FoV (15–25 DSV) at the same time. A Halbach array supplies a magnetic field that points in the transversal direction and has a quadrupolar pattern . An Inward-outward (IO) ring pair array supplies a magnetic field that points in the longitudinal direction which allows the application of the advancement of RF coils to the system. The pattern supplied by the latest designed IO ring pair array can be very close to a linear pattern, which leads to an efficient signal encoding and a good image quality

Calculation tools that calculate the magnetic fields of an PMA are necessary for an PMA design. A fast calculation provide high flexibility in magnet designs. MagTetris is a recently proposed method for fast calculations of magnetic fields.

== Forums on portable MRI/low-field MRI ==
- ISMRM Workshop on Low Field MRI, 17–18 March 2022
- A special section at the 2022 IEEE International Microwave Biomedical Conference (IMBioC 2022)， High field or low field for MRI, what do you think?, 16–18 May 2022
