= List of long-distance runners =

This is a list of people who compete professionally in long-distance running, or if not professional have won top level international medals or other such notable feats. It includes people covering distances from 3000 metres to 10000 metres and includes track, cross country and road running variants. For longer distances, see marathoners and ultramarathoners.

== Men ==
- Salvatore Antibo, winner of 5000 m 10,000 double at 1990 European Championships in Athletics in Split
- Saïd Aouita, ranked among the world's best at all distances between 800 metres and 5000 m in the 1980s, a gold medalist at the 1984 Olympics, and like Nurmi, was the world record holder for 1500 m, 3:29.46 in 1985, and 5000 m, 13:00.40 in 1985 and 12:58.39 in 1987
- Samuel Wanjiru (10 November 1986 – 15 May 2011), Kenyan, he won the London Marathon and the Chicago Marathon in 2009, which were the fastest marathons ever recorded in the United Kingdom and the United States respectively. He retained the Chicago title the following year.
- Wilson Kipsang Kiprotich, former world record holder for the marathon with a time of 2:03:23 which he set at the 2013 Berlin Marathon.
- Bernard Barmasai, former steeplechase world record holder
- Dieter Baumann, gold medalist in the 5000 m at the 1992 Olympics in Barcelona
- Kenenisa Bekele, set the current 5000 m world record of 12:37.35 at Hengelo, Netherlands and set the current 10,000 m world record of 26:17:53 at Brussels, Belgium, and is the gold medalist in the 10,000 m at the 2004 Olympics, 2005 World Championships, 2007 World Championships, 2008 Olympics, and 2009 World Championships. He is also the gold medalist in the 5000 m at the 2008 Olympics and 2009 World Championships.
- Abebe Bikila, double Olympic marathon champion in 1960 and 1964, most famous for winning the marathon in the 1960 Summer Olympics while running barefoot.
- Brahim Boulami, former steeplechase world record holder
- Christopher Chataway, set a 5000 m world record of 13 minutes 51.6 seconds in 1954, and was a pacesetter when Roger Bannister ran the first ever sub-4 minute mile that same year
- Ron Clarke, held the 10,000 meter world record for eight years
- Eamonn Coghlan, World 5000m champion 1983
- Mo Farah, winner of 5000m and 10,000m double at 2010 European Athletics Championships in Barcelona, with a successive double victory in the 5000m and 10,000m races of the 2012 London Olympic Games, and subsequently an Olympic 'double double', winning gold in the same distances at the 2016 Rio de Janeiro Olympic Games.
- Hicham El Guerrouj, double gold medalist at the 2004 Athens Olympics, and the reigning world record holder for the 1,500 metres, 3:26.00, the mile 3:43.13 and 2,000 metres, 4:44.79. He also captured the World Championship 5000m silver medal in 2003 and the Olympic 5000m gold medal in 2004.
- Haile Gebrselassie, considered one of the greatest distance runners of all time, was the 1996 and 2000 Olympic gold medalist in the 10,000 m, and held the 5000 m and 10,000 m world records from 1998 until 2004 with a mark of 12:39.36 and 26:22.75 respectively (still the second best athlete of all time). He also held the marathon world record from September 2007 to September 2011.
- Volmari Iso-Hollo, winner of 3000 m steeplechase at the 1932 and 1936 Summer Olympics
- Ben Jipcho, steeplechase world record holder
- Kipchoge Keino, first of many great distance runners from Kenya, who won gold in at the 1968 Olympics in the 1500 m and at the 1972 Olympics in the steeplechase
- Wilson Boit Kipketer, steeplechase world champion and world record holder
- Moses Kiptanui, three-time IAAF World Champion, and the first man to ever run the 3000 meter steeplechase in under 8 minutes.
- Moses Tanui, first athlete to run the half marathon in under 60 minutes in Milan on 3 April 1993.
- Hannes Kolehmainen, Finnish, original Flying Finn, winner of four Olympic gold medals
- Daniel Komen, thus far the only human ever to run back to back sub-four minute miles running a world record 7:58.61 for two miles in 1997 and world record holder in the 3000 , as well as past world record holder in the 5000.
- Zdzisław Krzyszkowiak, won 5000 m and 10 000 m double at 1958 European Championships in Athletics. Won 3,000m steeplechase at the 1960 Summer Olympics two months after setting 3,000m steeplechase world record of 8.31.4.
- Taisto Mäki, held the two miles, 5000 m and 10,000 m world records simultaneously for three years. The first man to run 10,000 m in under half an hour.
- Fernando Mamede, Portuguese athlete and former world-record holder. However, he never won any top-level competition
- Billy Mills, only American ever to win an Olympic gold medal in the 10,000 m, a surprising upset at the 1964 Tokyo Olympics
- Alain Mimoun, French runner who competed in track events, cross-country running and the marathon. He competed internationally for France on 86 occasions. He is the most medalled French athletics sportsperson in history. He won the 1956 Olympics marathon gold medal and 3 Olympic silver medals (1948 - 10,000 m; 1952 - 5,000 m and 10,000 m). He won 4 individual and 6 team titles at the International Cross Country Championships and was a four-time gold medallist at the Mediterranean Games, where he completed the 5,000 m/10,000 m double in both 1951 and 1955. From 1947 to 1966, he won a total of 29 senior titles in the 5000 m, 10000 m, marathon and cross-country events of the French national athletics championships.
- Noureddine Morceli, retired Algerian athlete, winner of the 1500 m run at the 1996 Summer Olympics, as well the gold medal in various world championships, in the 1990s, he held various world records, including 1500 m, the mile, 2000 m, and 3000 m
- David Moorcroft, set the world record for 5000 m on July 7, 1982, in Oslo, at the Bislett Games with a time of 13:00.41
- Paavo Nurmi, Finnish, regarded as one of the greatest track and field athlete of all time and winner of nine Olympic gold medals (despite missing 1932 games in a professional controversy over travel expenses), setting world records at distances between 1500 m and 20 km, and one of the Flying Finns
- Alan Webb, American, record holder for the American mile and the records for high school and high school sophomores.
- Steve Prefontaine, American middle- and long-distance athlete.
- Miruts Yifter, a.k.a. 'Yifter the Shifter', Ethiopian winner of two golds at the 1980 Olympics
- Gaston Reiff, 3000 meters world record holder for five years, Olympic gold on the 1948 5000 meters
- Ville Ritola, winner of five Olympic gold medals
- Gaston Roelants, Olympic gold medal winner and world record holder on the 3000 meter steeplechase
- Henry Rono, Kenyan runner who set several world records in 1978, and again broke the 5000 meters world record in 1981
- Paul Tergat, world record holder in the marathon 2003 - September 2007
- Juha Väätäinen, Finnish won 5000 m and 10,000 m double at the 1971 European Athletics Championships in Helsinki.
- Lasse Virén, Finnish winner of four gold medals at the 1972 and 1976 Olympics
- Ed Whitlock, an English-born Canadian long-distance runner, and the first person over 70 years old to run a marathon in less than three hours with a time of 2:59:10 in 2003.
- Emil Zátopek, winner of one silver and four gold medals at the 1948 Olympics and 1952 Olympics He was also the first person to break the 29 minute barrier in the 10,000 m run in 1954 And the first person to ever run over 20,000 m in 1 hour in 1951

== Women ==
- Wang Junxia, set 10,000 m world record of 29:31.78, the first-ever sub-30 minute performance by a woman, which broke the former record by 42 seconds. Also holds the 3,000 m world record of 8:06.11. World Champion for 10,000 m in 1993, Olympic Champion at 5000 m and silver medalist at 10,000 m at the Atlanta 1996 Games. Won numerous Asian titles at 5000m and 10,000m from 1992-1996. Only lost one 10,000 m race her entire career.
- Paula Radcliffe, multiple world record holder on the roads, marathon world record holder with a 2:15.25 performance, half marathon and cross country World Champion, fifth fastest at 10,000 m.
- Tirunesh Dibaba, current Olympic Champion at both 5000 m and 10,000 m (the first woman to win this double). The second woman to break 30 minutes after world record holder Wang Junxia.
- Catherine Ndereba, broke the women's marathon world record in 2001 at the Chicago Marathon.
- Derartu Tulu, 10,000 m gold medalist in 1992 and 2000, and the first woman from sub-Saharan Africa ever to win an Olympic gold medal
- Meseret Defar, 2004 and 2012 Olympic gold medalist at 5000 m, World champion in 2007 and 2013 in 5000m, and former world record holder
- Ingrid Kristiansen, world champion in the 10,000 m in 1987, she set five track world records
- Elvan Abeylegesse, former holder of the world record at 5000 m, clocking 14:24:68 in 2004
- Zola Budd, twice broke the world record in the women's 5000 m, running barefoot
- Mary Decker, set six world records in 1982, at distances ranging from the mile to 10,000 meters
- Tegla Loroupe, holds the world records in the one hour run, and for 20, 25 and 30 kilometer distances, and previously held the marathon world record
- Sonia O'Sullivan, World Champion in 5000m in 1995, European Champion in 3000m in 1994, won double gold at the 1998 European Championships at 5000 m and 10,000 m. Won Long Race and Short Race double at the 1998 World Cross Country Championships. Olympic Silver medallist at 5000m in 2000.
- Fernanda Ribeiro, European, World and Olympic 10,000 m gold medalist in 1994, 1995 and 1996, respectively
- Gulnara Samitova, set 3000 m steeplechase world record, clocking 9:01.59, in 2004
- Gabriela Szabo, Romanian who won the 2000 Olympic 5000 m gold medal in Sydney in a new Olympic record time of 14:40.79
- Gete Dukale, Ethiopian who got 4th place at the Tokyo Marathon with a time of 2:23:55

== See also ==
- List of marathoners
- List of middle-distance runners
