= Sodium MRI =

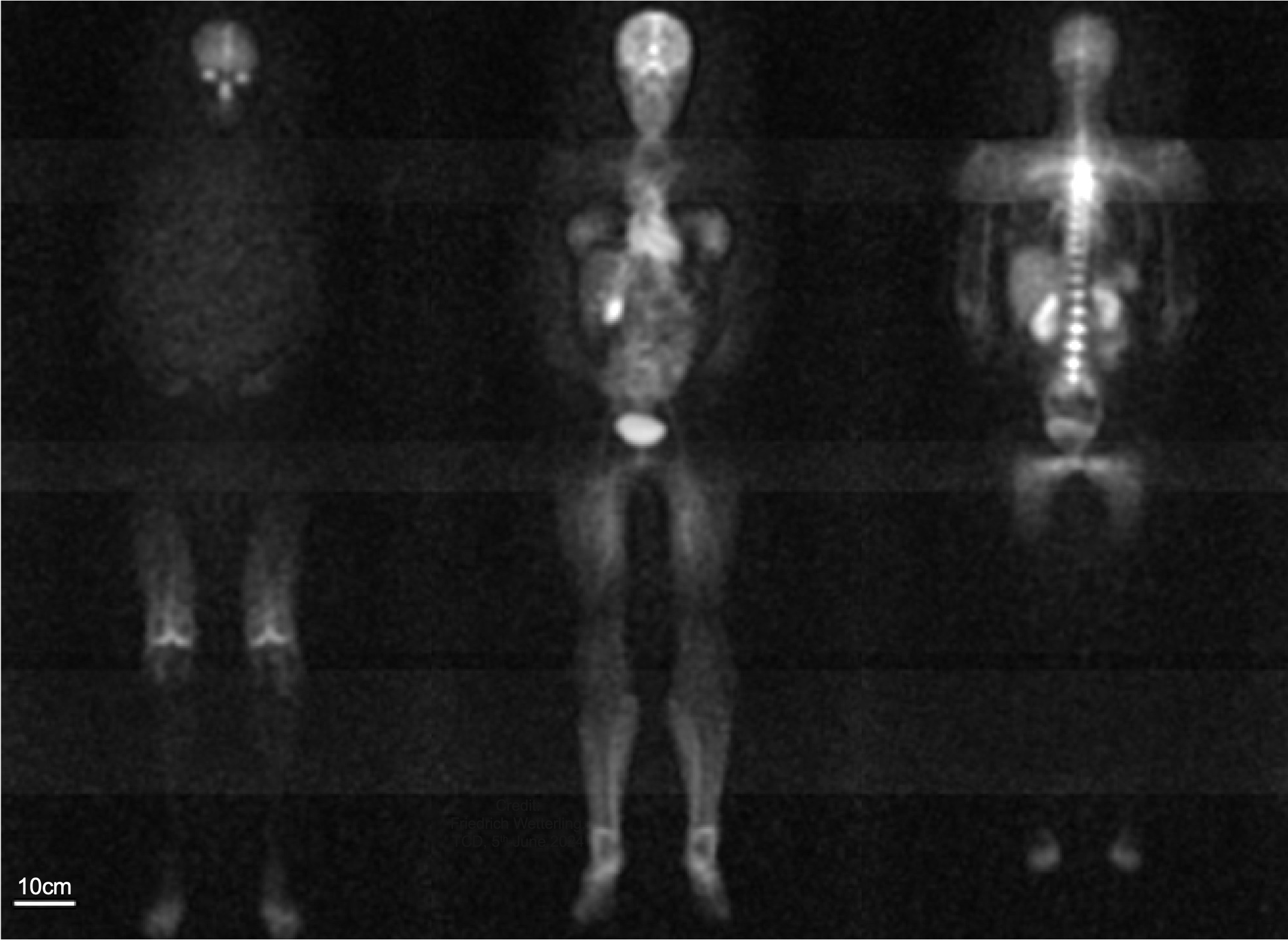
Sodium Magnetic Resonance Images of a female volunteer at 3T (6mm x 6mm in-plane resolution, 72mm slice thickness, captured in 50minutes for five segments)

Sodium MRI (also known as ^{23}Na-MRI) is a specialised magnetic resonance imaging technique that uses strong magnetic fields, magnetic field gradients, and radio waves to generate images of the distribution of sodium in the body, as opposed to more common forms of MRI that utilise protons (hydrogen atoms) present in water (^{1}H-MRI). Like the proton, sodium is naturally abundant in the body, and thus can be imaged directly without the need for contrast agents or hyperpolarization. Furthermore, sodium ions play a role in important biological processes via their contribution to concentration and electrochemical gradients across cellular membranes, making it of interest as an imaging target in health and disease.

In contrast to conventional proton MRI, sodium MRI is complicated by the low concentrations of sodium nuclei relative to the concentration of H_{2}O molecules in biological tissues (10-45 mM) and the lower gyromagnetic ratio of the ^{23}Na nucleus as compared to a ^{1}H nucleus. This causes low NMR sensitivity, meaning that a stronger magnetic field is required to obtain equivalent spatial resolution. The quadrupolar ^{23}Na nucleus also has a faster transverse relaxation rate and multiple quantum coherences as compared to the ^{1}H nucleus, requiring specialized and high-performance MRI sequences to capture information before the contrast used to image the body is lost.

== Biological significance ==
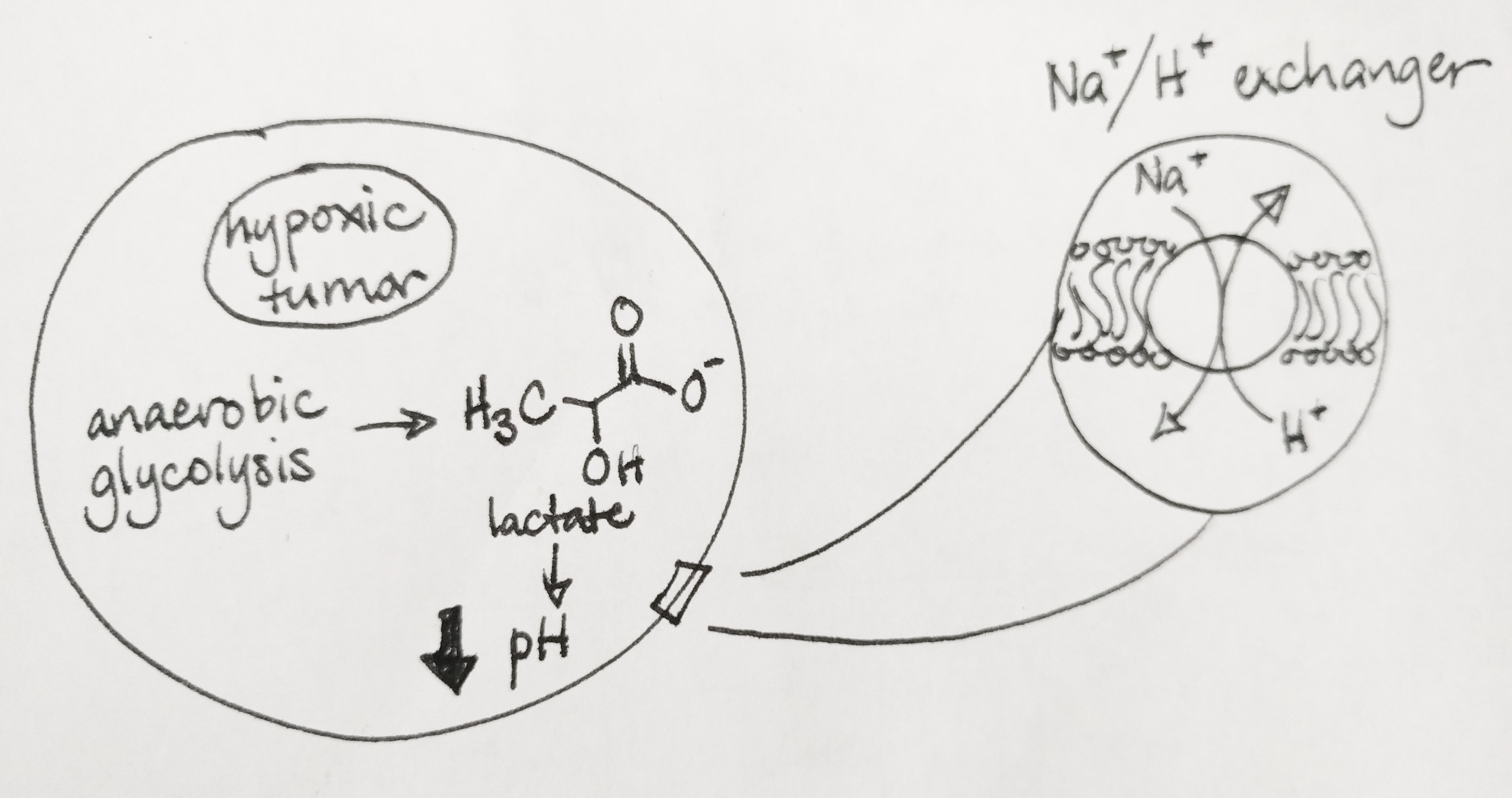
Effects of hypoxic tumor microenvironment on intracellular pH

Tissue sodium concentration (TSC) is tightly regulated by healthy cells and is altered by energy status and cellular integrity, making it an effective marker for disease states. Cells maintain a low intracellular Na^{+} concentration by actively pumping Na ions out via the Na^{+}/K^{+} ATPase channel. Any challenge to the cell's metabolism which lowers ATP supply or compromises the cell's membrane integrity will drastically increase intracellular Na^{+} concentrations. After exhaustive exercise, for example, ^{23}Na MRI can detect Na^{+} levels in tissues rising sharply, and can even visualize a sodium-rich meal in a patient's stomach. Malignant tumors in particular alter their metabolism drastically, often to account for hypoxic intratumor conditions, leading to a decrease in cytosolic pH. To compensate, Na^{+} ions from the extracellular space are exchanged for protons in the Na^{+}/H^{+} antiport, the loss of which often attenuates cancer growth. Therefore, ^{23}Na MRI is a useful clinical tool for detecting a number of disease states, including heart disease and cancer, as well as monitoring therapy. For example, ^{23}Na MRI has been shown to measure cellularity in ovarian cancer. Tissue damage in stroke patients can also be evaluated using ^{23}Na MRI, with one study showing that a change of 50% higher TSC than the TSC in healthy brain tissue is consistent with complete infarction, and therefore can be used to determine tissue viability and treatment options for the patient. Tumor malignancy can also be evaluated based on the increases in TSC of rapidly proliferating cells. Malignant tumors have approximately 50-60% increased TSC relative to that of healthy tissues – however, increases in TSC cannot be determined to be due to changes in extracellular volume, intracellular sodium content or neovascularization. Another interesting use of ^{23}Na MRI is in evaluating multiple sclerosis, wherein accumulation of sodium in axons can lead to axon degeneration. Preliminary studies have shown that there is a positive correlation between elevated TSC and disability.

== Uses in prostate cancer ==
Recently, work has been undertaken to assess the utility of using sodium MRI to characterize prostate cancer lesions in men. In this study, patients were imaged with sodium MRI prior to surgical removal of the prostate. TSC was extracted from the images and compared to the Gleason score of imaged lesions. This work showed statistically significant increases in TSC as prostate cancer increased in aggression. This preliminary study suggests that sodium MRI can accurately characterize the stage of prostate cancer. This suggests the potential use of sodium MRI for better management and staging of patients with prostate cancer into treatment schemes.

== Advantages ==
^{23}Na MRI measures cellular metabolic rate as well as disease-related change in tissues and organs. It has improved from a 45 minute length to only 15 minutes at 1.5T. For cartilage degeneration, proteoglycan degrades with negative charge, and positively charged sodium ion bonds with proteoglycan. Both the proteoglycan and sodium level decrease, so a decrease in signal is observed by sodium MRI and can be used for monitoring of proteoglycan degeneration in cartilage.

== See also ==
- Functional imaging
- ^{23}Na
- Hyperpolarized carbon-13 MRI
