= List of ultimate players =

This is a list of notable disc ultimate players

- Buzzy Hellring
- Robert L. "Nob" Rauch
- Joel Silver
- Ken Westerfield
- Abigail Howard
- Rebecca Hardie
