= Cerebrospinal fluid flow MRI =

CSF Flow MRI overview, methodology, and application

Cerebrospinal fluid (CSF) flow MRI is used to assess pulsatile CSF flow both qualitatively and quantitatively. Time-resolved 2D phase-contrast MRI with velocity encoding is the most common method for CSF analysis. CSF Fluid Flow MRI detects back and forth flow of Cerebrospinal fluid that corresponds to vascular pulsations from mostly the cardiac cycle of the choroid plexus. Bulk transport of CSF, characterized by CSF circulation through the Central Nervous System, is not used because it is too slow to assess clinically. CSF would have to pass through the brain's lymphatic system and be absorbed by arachnoid granulations.

== Cerebrospinal fluid (CSF) ==
CSF is a clear fluid that surrounds the brain and spinal cord. The rate of CSF formation in humans is about 0.3–0.4 ml per minute and the total CSF volume is 90–150 ml in adults.

Traditionally, CSF was evaluated mainly using invasive procedures such as lumbar puncture, myelographies, radioisotope studies, and intracranial pressure monitoring. Recently, rapid advances in imaging techniques have provided non-invasive methods for flow assessment. One of the best-known methods is Phase-Contrast MRI and it is the only imaging modality for both qualitative and quantitative evaluation. The constant progress of magnetic resonance sequences gives a new opportunity to develop new applications and enhance unknown mechanisms of CSF flow.

== Phase contrast MRI ==
The study of CSF flow became one of Phase-contrast MRI's major applications. The key to Phase-contrast MRI (PC-MRI) is the use of a bipolar gradient. A bipolar gradient has equal positive and negative magnitudes that are applied for the same time duration. The bipolar gradient in PC-MRI is put in a sequence after RF excitation but before data collection during the echo time of the generic MRI modality. The bipolar lobe must be applied in all three axes to image flow in all three directions.

=== Bipolar gradient ===
The basis of the bipolar gradient in PC-MRI is that when using this gradient to change frequencies, there will be no phase shift for the stationary protons because they will experience equal positive and negative magnitudes. However, the moving protons will undergo various degrees of phase shift because, along the gradient direction, their locations are constantly changing. This notion can be applied to monitor protons that are moving through a plane. From the phase contrast, the floating protons can be detected. In the equation for determining the phase, local susceptibility influence is not removed by this bipolar gradient. Thus, it is necessary to invert a second sequence with the bipolar gradient, and the signal must be subtracted from the original acquisition. The purpose of this step is to cancel out those static areas’ signals and produce the characteristic static appearance at phase-contrast imaging.

$\Delta\phi=\gamma\vec{\nu}\Delta M_1$ where $\Delta\phi$ = phase shift, $\gamma$ = gyromagnetic ratio, $\vec{\nu}$ is the proton velocity, and $\Delta M_1$ is the change in magnetic moment

Equation 1. This is used to calculate phase shift, which is directly proportional to the gradient strength according to the change in magnetic moment.

In phase-contrast imaging, there is a direct correlation between the degree of phase shift and the proton velocity in the direction of the gradient. However, because of the limitation of angles above 360°, the angle will wrap back to 0°, and only a specific range of proton velocities can be measured. For example, if a certain velocity leads to a 361° phase shift, we cannot distinguish this one from a velocity that causes a 1° phase shift. This phenomenon is called aliasing. Because both the forward direction velocity and the backward direction velocity are important, phase angles are usually within the range from −180° to 180°.

Using the bipolar gradient, it is possible to create a phase shift of spins that move with a specific velocity in the axis direction. Spins moving towards the bipolar gradient have a positive net phase shift, whereas spins moving away from the gradient have a negative net phase shift. Positive phase shifts are generally shown as white, while negative phase shifts are black. The net phase shift is directly proportional to both the time of bipolar gradient application and the flow velocity. This is why it is important to pick a velocity parameter that is similar in magnitude and width to that of the bipolar gradient - this is denoted as velocity encoding.

=== Velocity encoding ===
Velocity encoding (VENC), measured in cm/s, is directly related to the properties of the bipolar gradient. The VENC is used as the highest estimated fluid velocity in PC-MRI. Underestimating VENC leads to aliasing artifacts, as any velocity slightly higher than the VENC value has the opposite sign phase shift. However, overestimating the VENC value leads to a lower acquired flow signal and a lower SNR. Typical CSF flow is 5–8 cm/s; however, patients with hyper-dynamic circulation often require higher VENCs of up to 25 cm/s. An accurate VENC value helps generate the highest signal possible.

$Since\ \Delta\phi<\pi, \ \vec{\nu}<VENC$

$VENC = \frac{\pi}{\gamma\Delta M_1}$

Equation 2. This is used to calculate VENC, which is inversely proportional to gradient strength. The variables are equivalent to those defined in Equation 1.

=== Images ===
PC-MRI is made of a magnitude and phase image for each plane and VENC obtained. In the magnitude image, cerebrospinal fluid (CSF) that is flowing is a brighter signal and stationary tissues are suppressed and visualized as black background. The phase image is phase-shift encoded, where white high signals represent forward flowing CSF and black low signals represent backwards flow. Since the phase image is phase-dependent, the velocity can be quantitatively estimated from the image. The background is mid-grey in color. There is also a re-phased image, which is the magnitude of flow of the compensated signal. It includes bright high signal flow and a background that is visible.

The phase-contrast velocity image has greater sensitivity to CSF flow than the magnitude image, since the velocity image reflects the phase shifts of the protons. There are two sets of phase-contrast images used in evaluating CSF flow. The first is imaging of the axial plane, with through-plane velocity that shows the craniocaudal direction of flow (from cranial to caudal end of the structure). The second image is in the sagittal plane, where the velocity is shown in-plane and images the craniocaudal direction. The first technique allows for flow quantification, while the second allows for qualitative assessment. Through-plane analysis is usually done perpendicular to the aqueduct and is more accurate for quantitative evaluation because this minimizes the partial volume effect, a main limitation of PC-MRI. The partial volume effect occurs when a voxel includes a boundary of static and moving materials, this leads to an overestimate of phase which results in inaccurate velocities at material boundaries. These quantitative and qualitative CSF flow images can be acquired in about 8-10 additional minutes than a regular MRI.

== Choosing parameters ==
Factors that impact PC-MRI include VENC, repetition time (TR), and signal-to-noise ratio (SNR). To capture CSF flow of 5–8 cm/s, it is necessary to use a strong bipolar gradient. VENC is inversely proportional to magnitude and time of application. This means that a slower VENC value needs a higher magnitude bipolar gradient applied for a longer time. This results in a larger TR value; however, TR can only be increased to a certain extent, as a short repetition time is needed for higher temporal resolution since the data is plotted relative to a full cardiac cycle. Therefore, it is important to balance these parameters to maximize resolution.

== Quantification ==
To quantify CSF flow, it is important to define the region of interest, which can be done using a cross-sectional area measurement, for example. Then, velocity versus time can be plotted. Velocity is typically pulsatile due to systole and diastole, and the area under the curve can yield the amount of flow. Systole produces forward flow, while diastole produces backwards flow.

== Applications ==
=== Clinical ===
CSF flow can be used in diagnosing and treating aqueduct stenosis, normal pressure hydrocephalus, and Chiari malformation.

Aqueduct stenosis is the narrowing of the aqueduct of Sylvius which blocks the flow of CSF, causing fluid buildup in the brain called hydrocephalus. Decreased aqueduct stroke volume and peak systolic velocity could be detected through CSF flow to diagnose a patient with aqueduct stenosis.

Normal pressure hydrocephalus (NPH) looks at CSF flow values and velocities, which is important for diagnosis because NPH is idiopathic and has varying symptoms amongst patients including urinary incontinence, dementia, and gait disturbances. Increased aqueduct CSF stroke volume and velocity are indicators of NPH. It is critically important to recognize and treat NPH because NPH is one of the few potentially treatable causes of dementia. The treatment of choice in NPH is ventriculoperitoneal shunt surgery (VPS). This treatment needs a VP shunt, which is a catheter with a valve aiming at implementing a one-way outflow of the excessive amount of CSF from the ventricles. It is obligatory to have patency control because of some possible complications such as infections and obstruction. Due to the development and widespread of PC-MRI, it superseded spin-echo(SE) images, which is the traditional way to choose patients who might benefit from a VPS. And PC-MRI gradually became the most often used sequence to evaluate the CSF flow pattern in patients with NPH in relation to the cardiac cycle.

Figure 1. The MRI of a patient with normal pressure hydrocephalus (NPH) showing pulsations of CSF with heartbeat is shown in this moving image.

Chiari malformation (CMI) is when the cerebellar tonsils push through the foramen magnum of the skull. CSF flow varies based on level of tonsil descent and type of Chiari malformation, so the MRI can also be helpful in deciding the type of surgery to be performed and monitoring progress. CSF flow will be altered within different regions of the spinal cord and brain stem because of the changes in the morphology of the posterior fossa and craniocervical junction, which enables PC-MRI as a fundamental technique in CMI research studies and clinical evaluation.

=== Limitations ===
In PC-MRI, the quantitative analysis of stroke volume, mean peak velocity, and peak systolic velocity is possible only in the plane that is perpendicular to the unidirectional flow. Additionally, it is not possible to calculate multidirectional flow in multiaxial planes in 2D or 3D PC-MRI. This means that it is not a useful technique in clinical applications that have turbulent flow.

=== Future ===
Emerging 4D PC-MRI is showing promising results in the assessment of multidirectional flow. The 4D imaging modality adds time as a dimension to the 3D image. There are many applications of 4D PC-MRI, including the ability to examine blood flow patterns. This is particularly helpful for cardiac and aortic imaging, but the major limitation remains the image acquisition time.
