= Gete Dukale =

Ethiopian long-distance runner

Personal information
- Nationality: Ethiopian
- Born: Gete Dukale; 14 March 1996 (age 30) Ethiopia
- Occupation: long-distance runner

Sport
- Country: Ethiopia
- Sport: Athletics
- Event(s): Marathon, Long-distance running

Achievements and titles
- Personal best: Marathon: 2:23:55 (2024)
Medal record
Athletics
Representing Ethiopia
Bronze medal – third place	2023 Rome Marathon	Marathon
Bronze medal – third place	2024 Dublin Marathon	Marathon

Gete Dukale (born 14 March 1996) is an Ethiopian long-distance runner who specializes in the marathon.

== Career ==
In 2023, Dukale achieved a podium finish at the Rome Marathon, placing third with a time of 2:27:10—a personal best at the time.

She continued her progress later that year at the Valencia Marathon, finishing sixth in a highly competitive field with a new personal best of 2:25:48.

In 2024, Dukale built on her momentum at the Tokyo Marathon, where she finished fourth and significantly improved her personal best to 2:23:55. Later that year, she secured another podium finish at the Dublin Marathon, placing third with a time of 2:28:29 in an Ethiopian sweep of the women's podium.

== Achievements ==
Year	Race	Place	Position	Time	Notes
2023	Rome Marathon	Rome	3rd	2:27:10	Personal best at the time
2023	Valencia Marathon	Valencia	6th	2:25:48	
2024	Tokyo Marathon	Tokyo	4th	2:23:55	Personal best
2024	Dublin Marathon	Dublin	3rd	2:28:29	

== Personal bests ==
As of May 2025, Gete Dukale's personal best in the marathon is:

- Marathon – 2:23:55 (Tokyo, 3 March 2024)
