= Lists of women's association football players =

The following are lists of people who play women's football (soccer).

- List of women's footballers with 100 or more international goals
- List of women's footballers with 100 or more international caps
- List of top international women's football goal scorers by country
- List of English women's football champions
- List of England women's international footballers
- List of foreign FA Women's Super League players
- List of foreign NWSL players
- List of Spain women's international footballers
- List of United States women's international soccer players
- List of women's Olympic football tournament records and statistics
- List of goalscoring goalkeepers
- List of association football families

== See also ==
- Lists of women's association football players by national team
- List of women's international association football competitions
- List of women's national association football teams
- List of female American football players
