= Lists of men's association football players =

The following are lists of people who play men's football (soccer). For people who play women's football (soccer), see Lists of women's association football players.

== General ==
- List of footballers with 100 or more caps
- List of top international men's association football goal scorers by country
- List of retired numbers in association football
- List of Premier League winning players
- List of association football families
- List of dual Irish international footballers
- List of goalscoring goalkeepers
- List of association footballers who died while playing

== Foreign ==
- List of foreign Bundesliga players
- List of foreign football players in the Netherlands
- List of foreign Premier League players
- List of foreign Primeira Liga players
- List of foreign La Liga players
- List of foreign Liga MX players
- List of foreign Ligue 1 players
- List of foreign MLS players
- List of foreign Serie A players
- List of foreign footballers in Japan

== See also ==
- List of people by occupation
- List of American football players
- List of Australian Rules footballers
- List of footballers (Gaelic football)
- List of association football competitions
