= List of Gaelic footballers =

The following are some of the most notable Gaelic footballers. For a complete list see Category:Gaelic footballers and Category:Gaelic football managers.

== Team of the Millennium ==
This was a team chosen in August 1999 by a panel of GAA past presidents and journalists. The goal was to single out the best ever 15 players who had played the game in their respective positions, since the foundation of the GAA in 1884 up to the Millennium year, 2000. Naturally many of the selections were hotly debated by fans around the country.

| | Goalkeeper |
| | Dan O'Keeffe (Kerry) |
| Right Corner Back | Full back | Left Corner Back |
| Enda Colleran (Galway) | Joe Keohane (Kerry) | Seán Flanagan (Mayo) |
| Right half back | Centre back | Left half back |
| Seán Murphy (Kerry) | J. J. O'Reilly (Cavan) | Martin O'Connell (Meath) |
| | Midfield |
| Mick O'Connell (Kerry) | | Tommy Murphy (Laois) |
| Right half forward | Centre forward | Left half forward |
| Pat Spillane (Kerry) | Seán Purcell (Galway) | Seán O'Neill (Down) |
| Right corner forward | Full forward | Left corner forward |
| Kevin Heffernan (Dublin) | Tommy Langan (Mayo) | Mikey Sheehy (Kerry) |

== Vodafone Footballer of the Year ==
| 2007 | Marc Ó Sé | Kerry |
| 2006 | Kieran Donaghy | Kerry |
| 2005 | Stephen O'Neill | Tyrone |
| 2004 | Tomás Ó Sé | Kerry |
| 2003 | Steven McDonnell | Armagh |
| 2002 | Kieran McGeeney | Armagh |
| 2001 | Michael Donnellan | Galway |
| 2000 | Johnny Crowley | Kerry |
| 1999 | Trevor Giles | Meath |
| 1998 | Michael Donnellan | Galway |
| 1997 | Maurice Fitzgerald | Kerry |
| 1996 | Martin O'Connell | Meath |
| 1995 | Peter Canavan | Tyrone |

== See also ==
- List of All-Ireland Senior Football Championship winning captains
