= AHP =

AHP or Ahp may refer to:

== Ahp ==
- Krasue, known as Ahp in Cambodia, a nocturnal female spirit of Southeast Asian folklore

== AHP as an abbreviation ==
=== Highway patrols ===
- Alabama Highway Patrol
- Arizona Highway Patrol
- Arkansas Highway Patrol

=== Other uses ===
- Above Head of Passes, the Head of Passes being the datum from which mileages on the Lower Mississippi River are measured
- Adiabatic Half-Passage, an Adiabatic MRI Pulse design
- African humid period, a period during the Holocene when Africa was much wetter than today
- Afterhyperpolarization, in neurology
- UCSF Alliance Health Project
- Alpha Eta Rho, a professional college aviation fraternity
- American Home Products, now Wyeth, an American company
- American Homeowner Preservation, an online real estate crowdfunding platform
- Analytic Hierarchy Process, a mathematical decision-making technique
- Associated Hygienic Products LLC, part of DSG International Ltd.
- Accelerated hydrogen peroxide, a trademark for a solution of hydrogen peroxide
- Association health plan, in health insurance in the United States
- Allied health professionals

== AHP as a code ==
- Port Alexander Seaplane Base, Alaska, U.S., FAA LID: AHP
- Apro language, ISO 639-3 language code ahp
