= Fat saturation =

Fat saturation may refer to:

- Saturated and unsaturated compounds of fatty acids
  - Saturated fat
  - Unsaturated fat
- "Fat sat", a technical sequence for fat suppression in MRI imaging
