= DSG International =

DSG International may refer to:

- DSG International plc, a British retail group, formerly known as Dixons Group plc
- DSG International Ltd., or Disposable Soft Goods International, a manufacturing company based in Hong Kong
