= Fat suppression =

Medical imaging technique

Fat suppression is an MRI technique in which fat signal from adipose tissue is suppressed to better visualize uptake of contrast material by bodily tissues, reduce chemical shift artifact, and to characterize certain types of lesions such as adrenal gland tumors, bone marrow infiltration, fatty tumors, and steatosis by determining the fat content of the tissues. Due to short relaxation times, fat exhibits a strong signal in magnetic resonance imaging (MRI), easily discernible on scans.

Fat suppression can be achieved through various techniques as outlined below:

1. Frequency Selective Pulses (CHESS): This method leverages the difference in resonance frequency with water, employing frequency selective pulses. Known as fat saturation (fat-sat) techniques, this approach facilitates effective fat suppression.
2. Phase Contrast Techniques: Operating on the same principle as black boundary or india ink artifacts, phase contrast techniques contribute to suppressing fat signals in MRI.
3. Inversion Recovery Sequences (STIR Technique): Utilizing short T1 relaxation time, the STIR technique involves inversion recovery sequences to achieve fat suppression.
4. Dixon Method: A distinct approach to fat suppression that is primarily used to achieve uniform fat suppression.
5. Hybrid Techniques (e.g., SPIR): Innovative approaches involve the combination of multiple fat suppression techniques, exemplified by SPIR, which integrates spectral presaturation with inversion recovery.

The choice of a specific fat suppression technique should be guided by several factors, including the intended purpose—whether it is for contrast enhancement or tissue characterization. Considerations such as the quantity of fat in the tissue under examination, the magnetic field strength, and the homogeneity of the main magnetic field play crucial roles in the selection process.
