= Accelerated hydrogen peroxide =

Disinfectant with stabilized hydrogen peroxide

Accelerated hydrogen peroxide (AHP) is a trademark (Note: registered in Canada and owned by a US hygiene product provider Diversey Inc.) for a stabilized solution of hydrogen peroxide whose antibacterial efficacy is enhanced by a surfactant and an organic acid. AHP is used as a disinfectant/cleaning agent.

== Properties ==
A 2% solution of accelerated hydrogen peroxide achieves a high level of disinfection in 5 minutes and is suitable for disinfecting hard plastic medical devices such as endoscopes. In addition to being an excellent fungicide, chemicals using accelerated hydrogen peroxide have been suggested by some papers to be safer for humans and more environmentally friendly.

In research done in 2016, accelerated hydrogen peroxide demonstrated effectiveness against the foot-and-mouth disease virus (FMDV), swine vesicular disease virus (SVDV), along with Senecavirus A.

Effectiveness against ringworm and parvovirus has also been cited by veterinarians.

== Usage ==
Recommendation by the World Health Organization

The WHO has announced that AHP is particularly effective in disinfecting hospital facilities, and cites accelerated hydrogen peroxide as one of the disinfectants that are used for adequate sterilization.

Japan

In May 2020, accelerated hydrogen peroxide was utilized for disinfection when there was a rapid spread of COVID-19 on board the cruise vessel Costa Atlantica while anchored by the Mitsubishi Nagasaki Shipyard, according to Japanese media. The product used for sterilization on the Costa Atlantica was OXILITE PRO, the first Japanese-made accelerated hydrogen peroxide disinfectant.

Canada

During the SARS pandemic in 2003, the Ministry of Health and Long-Term Care of Ontario published a training bulletin citing accelerated hydrogen peroxide solutions as effective agents against emergency vehicles and equipment used in transporting SARS infected patients.

As of October 2020, Health Canada includes accelerate hydrogen peroxide disinfectants as effective solutions against SARS-CoV-2, the novel Coronavirus.

United States

Between the years 2006 and 2011, amid risks of powerful bacteria such as Clostridioides difficile and MRSA infecting patients by adhering onto hospital facilities, Hunterdon Medical Center, which used accelerated hydrogen peroxide based disinfectants for sanitation, cut C. diff and MRSA infection rates by 79% and 66% respectively.

United Kingdom

In a 2007 guidance report by the Norovirus Working Group in the Health Protection Agency, together with the Maritime and Coastguard Agency, accelerated hydrogen peroxide has been reported to show effectiveness against feline calicivirus, a surrogate for norovirus.
