= DSG International Ltd. =

DSG International Ltd, also known as Disposable Soft Goods International, was established in 1973 in Hong Kong. It engages in the manufacture and marketing of disposable baby diapers, training pants, youth pants, and adult incontinence products. It markets its products to wholesalers, retailers, and grocery chains primarily in the United States, People's Republic of China, Thailand, Singapore, Indonesia and Malaysia under the following brands: Fitti, BabyLove, PetPet, Certainty and Dispo123. Since its establishment in 1973 in Hong Kong, DSG International has become the fourth largest manufacturer of disposable baby diapers and training pants.

== Subsidiaries ==
Logo of DSG International (Thailand)

DSG International (Thailand) Public Company Limited (DSGT) was founded on May 20, 1994 as a collaboration between DSG International Limited and the Anuwongnukroh family, Mr. Praphan and Mrs. Suwanna Anuwongnukroh, to produce and distribute disposable baby diapers in the Southeast Asian region. The company was listed on the Stock Exchange of Thailand on August 9, 2006, and delisted in 2017. It was very successful in manufacturing and selling baby diapers under the brand BabyLove (ranked number 2 in Thailand), PetPet (ranked number 3 in Malaysia) and adult diapers under the brand name Certainty (ranked no1 in Thailand). The company also expanded to Cambodia, Laos, Myanmar, Vietnam and Philippines. In 2018, the subsidiary was sold to Unicharm Corporation.

Associated Hygienic Products LLC (AHP) is a wholly owned subsidiary of DSG that has been manufacturing, marketing and selling disposable baby diapers and training pants for customers in North America since 1984. In 2013, the group was sold to Domtar.

DSGZS (Zhongshan) China was established in 1993.
