= Adiabatic MRI Pulses =

Adiabatic radio frequency (RF) pulses are used in magnetic resonance imaging (MRI) to achieve excitation that is insensitive to spatial inhomogeneities in the excitation field or off-resonances in the sampled object.

Nuclear magnetic resonance (NMR) experiments are often performed with surface transceiver coils that have desirable sensitivity, but have the disadvantage of producing an inhomogeneous excitation field. This inhomogeneous field causes spatial variations in spin flip angles, which, in turn, causes errors and degrades the receiver's sensitivity. RF pulses can be designed to create low-variation flip-angles or uniform magnetization inversion across a sample, even in the presence of inhomogeneities such as B1-variation and off-resonance.

== Analysis - Adiabatic Excitation Principles ==
=== Traditional RF Excitation ===
In traditional MRI RF excitation, an RF pulse, B_{1}, is applied with a frequency that is resonant with the Larmor precession frequency of the spins of interest. In the frame rotating at the Larmor frequency, the effective field experienced by the spins is in the transverse plane. Observing the spins in this frame shows spins precessing about B_{effective} at a frequency proportional to $\left\vert \gamma B_{\text{effective}} \right\vert$. If the RF pulse is applied for a time shorter than the period of this precession, one can engineer the flip-angle (the angle with z-axis) by turning the pulse on and off at the appropriate time.

In RF excitation analysis, the effective field is derived in the rotating frame of reference, which depends on the radial frequency of the radio-frequency $B_1$ field. $B_{\text{total}}$ in the laboratory frame is written as:

$$B_{\text{total}} =\begin{bmatrix} B_1 \cos(\omega_{\text{rotating frame}}\cdot t) \\ B_1 \sin(\omega_{\text{rotating frame}}\cdot t) \\ B_0 \end{bmatrix}$$

Where B_{0} is the background magnetic field which points along the laboratory z-axis.

In the frame rotating about the z-axis at radial frequency, the effective magnetic field can be derived:

$$B_{\text{effective}} =\begin{bmatrix} B_1 \\ 0 \\ B_0-\frac{\omega_{\text{rotating frame}}}{\gamma} \end{bmatrix}$$

When $\omega_{\text{rotating frame}}$ is equal to the Larmor frequency for a particular spin, defined as $\left\vert \gamma B_{0} \right\vert$, $B_{\text{effective}}$ has only an x-component for that spin. Therefore, the spin will precess about the x-axis in the rotating frame.

=== Adiabatic Passage ===
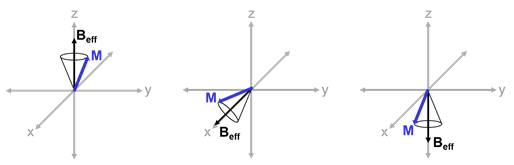
Figure 1. Spins precess around B_{effective}, and if B_{effective} meets the adiabatic condition, these spins will track the position of B_{effective} as it changes.

In general, the RF magnetic field can be written with a time-varying phase and time-varying amplitude, so that,

$$B_{\text{total}}(t) =\begin{bmatrix} A(t)\cos(\phi(t)) \\ A(t)\sin(\phi(t)) \\ B_0 \end{bmatrix}$$

And B_{effective} in the frame rotating at $\omega(t) = \frac{d\phi}{dt}$ can be written as:

$$B_{\text{effective}} =\begin{bmatrix} A(t) \\ 0 \\ B_0-\frac{\omega(t)}{\gamma} \end{bmatrix}$$

Figure 2. B_{effective} magnitude and phase for the hyperbolic secant adiabatic pulse with different RF peak power. The direction of $B_{\text{effective}}$ is relatively independent of RF peak power.

In an “adiabatic passage” process, the parameters A and ω can be varied gradually. Magnetic spin components that are in parallel with B_{effective} in the rotating frame will “track” B_{effective} as it changes, provided that B_{effective} changes “slowly enough.” Similarly, components that are perpendicular to B_{effective} will remain perpendicular to B_{effective} as it gradually changes direction. Figure 1 shows how spins track B_{effective} in an adiabatic passage transition.

The “gradualness” of the changing B_{effective} is defined as the “adiabaticity,” K, of the pulse, which is given by:

$K = \frac{\left \vert \gamma B_{effective} \right \vert}{\left \vert \frac{d\varphi}{dt} \right \vert} =\frac {\gamma\sqrt{A^2(t) + \left ( B_0-\frac{\omega(t)}{\gamma} \right )^2}} {\frac{d}{dt}\left ( \arctan(\frac{A(t)}{B_0-\frac{\omega(t)}{\gamma}}) \right )}$

where $\varphi$ is defined as the angle of B_{effective} with the z-axis in the rotating frame of reference.

The term K can be understood by examining the ratio by which it is defined: the precession frequency of a spin about B_{effective} is proportional to the strength of the effective field, and the angle of the field, phi, must change slower than the precession frequency so that the spin can “track” the effective field as it changes direction. This means that in order for a pulse to be considered adiabatic, the K-factor, or adiabaticity, must be much greater than 1 for the entire duration of the excitation sequence.

Figure 2 shows the magnitude and angle of $B_{\text{effective}}$ for a commonly used type of adiabatic sweep modulation function where A(t) and $\varphi$(t) are given by:

$A(t)=A_0 \operatorname{sech}(\beta t); \omega_1(t) = -\mu \beta \operatorname{tanh}(\beta t)$

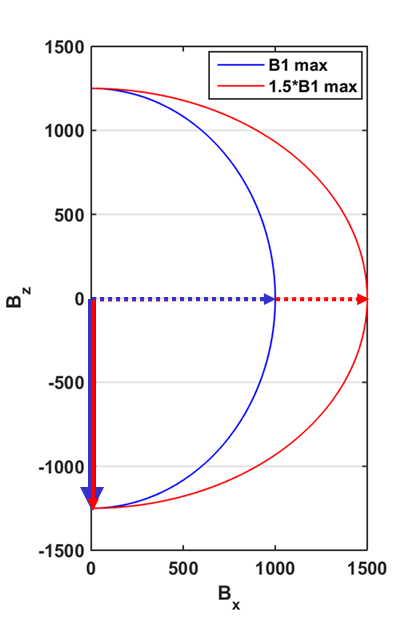
Figure 3. Sweep diagram for on-resonance spins in the case of the hyperbolic secant adiabatic pulse, for different RF peak powers. The direction of B_{effective} is relatively independent of RF peak power. Solid arrows are the final effective fields for AFP; dotted arrows are the final effective fields for AHP.

It is common to examine the so-called “sweep-diagram” for adiabatic pulses. Sweep-diagrams plot the trajectory of the effective field for a spin with a particular resonance frequency. Figure 3 shows the sweep diagram for two on-resonance spins: blue sweep trajectory for a spin experiencing a B_{1} field strength without error, and red sweep trajectory for a spin experiencing a B_{1} field strength with significant deviation. Since the direction of B_{effective} is largely independent of B_{1} strength, adiabatic pulses are considered insensitive to B_{1} inhomogeneities.

For off-resonance spins, the B_{effective} sweep diagram is shifted up or down by the amount of off-resonance. Another interpretation: the frequency excursion of the adiabatic pulse is always centered at the presumed Larmor frequency. If we have a spin which is not at the Larmor frequency, the relative frequency excursion of the adiabatic RF pulse will not be centered at that spin's resonance.

== Adiabatic Pulse Design ==
Adiabatic passage can be used to design several different kinds of pulses, which can be insensitive to common variations that are common in modern MRI system design. Several common adiabatic sequences are summarized here: adiabatic half-passage (AHP), adiabatic full-passage (AFP); and B_{1}-insensitive rotation (BIR) pulses.

=== Adiabatic Half-Passage (AHP) ===
The sweep diagram for AHP is the same as in Figure 3. Half-passage refers to a 90-degree rotation of B_{effective}. If the initial magnetization is along the initial axis of B_{effective}, the magnetization will track B_{effective} as it rotates. If the initial magnetization has components in the transverse plane, these perpendicular components will precess around B_{effective} during the time of the AHP pulse. The accumulated phase will depend on the length of the pulse and the strength of B_{effective}, so signal strength after AHP can be sensitive to initial transverse magnetization.

=== Adiabatic Full-Passage (AFP) ===
The sweep diagram for AFP is also shown in Figure 4. AFP pulses are exactly the same as AHP pulses, except that the angle of B_{effective} is changed to 180 degrees. AFP pulses are also known as adiabatic inversion pulses.

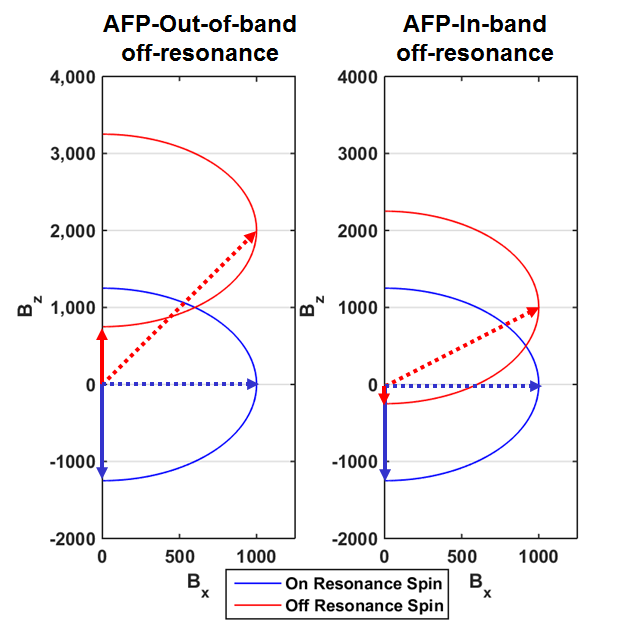
Figure 4. Adiabatic full-passage (AFP) pulses are off-resonance-insensitive for a certain bandwidth. Sweep diagrams for two off-resonances are shown in red. In the left plot, the off-resonance magnetization will be inverted by the end of the AFP pulse. In the right plot, the off-resonance magnetization will not be inverted by the end of the AFP pulse. Solid arrows are the final effective fields for AFP; dotted arrows are the final effective fields for AHP.

An interesting feature of AFP pulses is their insensitivity to off-resonance spins in a particular bandwidth. Figure 4 shows sweep diagrams for an on-resonance spin (blue) and the same sweep parameters for an off-resonance spin (red). The effective field has a trajectory which is shifted upward, but still has a final ending position which points along the –z-axis. For this reason, AFP pulses are considered insensitive to off-resonance sources, within a certain bandwidth. Spins with off-resonance outside this bandwidth will not experience an inversion, as shown in the sweep diagram.

=== B1-Insensitive Rotation (BIR) Pulses ===
BIR pulses, also called “universal rotators,” induce arbitrary flip angles for all spins in a plane perpendicular to the rotation axis defined by B_{effective}. The plane that is perpendicular to B_{effective} is only defined by the direction of B_{effective}, and not the strength of B_{effective}. As long as adiabaticity is maintained during rotations of B_{effective}, inhomogeneities in the B_{1} field strength will not have an effect on the flip-angle of the magnetization after a BIR pulse. Two commonly analyzed BIR pulse sequences are explained and summarized here: the BIR-1 and BIR-4 pulse sequences.

==== BIR-1 ====
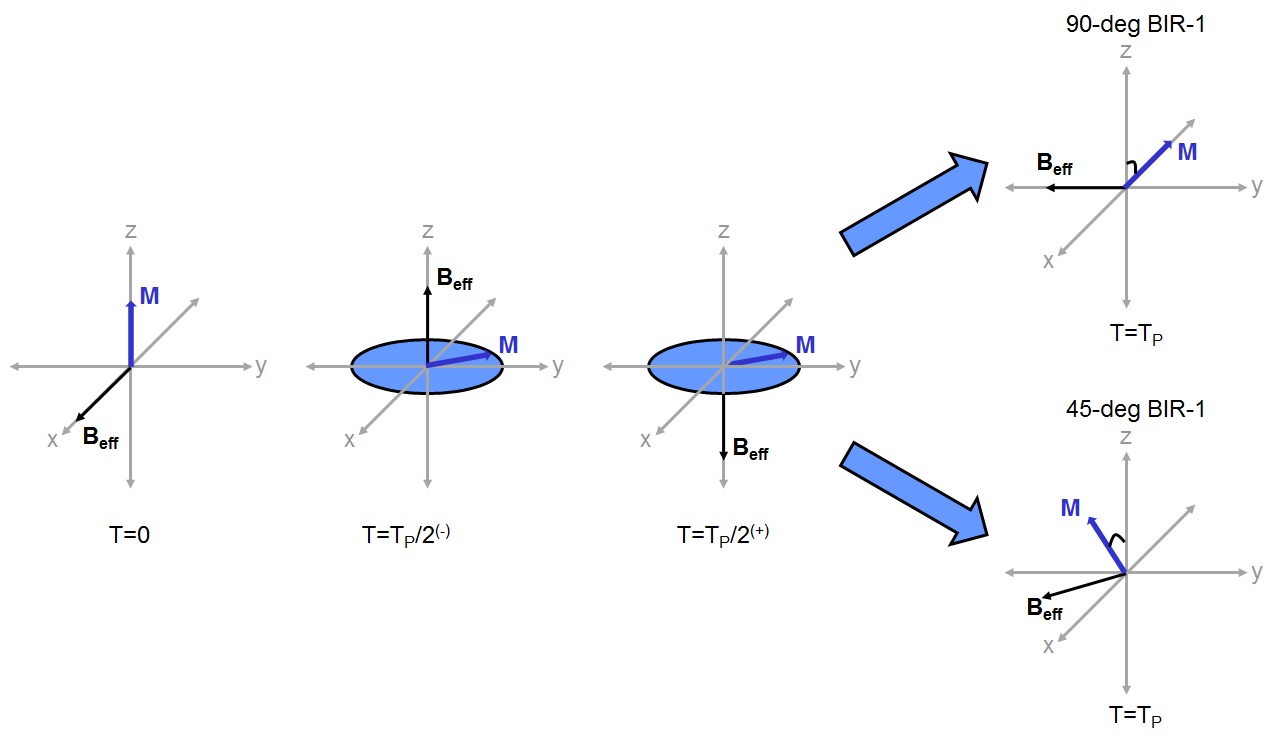
Figure 5. BIR-1 pulse sequence for 90-degree and 45-degree flip-angles.

An important BIR pulse is known as the BIR-1. In this sequence, B_{effective} is applied initially along the +x-axis in the rotating frame, and then adiabatically swept from the +x-axis to the +z-axis. Magnetization in the plane initially perpendicular to B_{effective} remains perpendicular to B_{effective} throughout the adiabatic sweep. In the time that it takes the field to sweep, M precesses about the B_{effective} axis. Spins will have an arbitrary phase accrual due to precession about B_{effective} in the time period T_{P}/2, and the amount of phase accrual will depend on the strength of B_{1}. In the second half of the pulse, B_{effective} is applied along the -z-axis and adiabatically swept to point along the -y-axis. If the time of the -z to -y sweep is the same as the original +x to +z sweep, the phase-accrual due to B_{1} inhomogeneity will be reversed and M will now point along the -x axis. This process is shown in Figure 5, along the 90-degree path.

BIR-1 pulses can be used to achieve an arbitrary flip angle. This is achieved by applying a phase-shift relative to the initial B_{effective}. In the case described above, the phase shift is 90-degrees. This can be understood by examining how the plane rotates during the second half of the BIR pulse. For a flip-angle of theta, the phase shift is designed:

$\Delta\phi=180^\circ + \theta$

The BIR-1 pulse with arbitrary flip-angle will rotate M about the x-axis by theta, and then apply a phase-shift of theta. This means that all flip-angles induced by BIR-1 pulses will not lie in the same plane.

BIR-1 pulses can be sensitive to off-resonance effects for several reasons. Firstly, off-resonance spins will have asymmetric phase accrual in the first and second halves of the pulse, meaning that off-resonance spins may not be refocused by the BIR-1. Secondly, the initial B_{effective} for an off-resonance spin can have a significant component pointing along the z-axis of the rotating frame, which causes the spin to track B_{effective} during the entire adiabatic pulse (known as “spin-locking”). Spin-locked sources will end up pointing along the -y-axis after a BIR-1 pulse, since that is the final direction for B_{effective}.

==== BIR-4 ====
A BIR-4 pulse is designed simply as two BIR-1 pulses back-to-back. For a 180-degree excitation (inversion), the second BIR-1 sequence is performed with B_{effective} initially pointing along the –y-axis, sweeps to the +z-axis, flips to the –z-axis, and sweeps to the +x-axis. Exactly in the same manner as the first BIR-1 pulse, phase accrual of M occurs in the sweep from –y to +z, and is undone in the sweep from –z to +x.

Arbitrary flip angles are achieved by selecting a phase-shift for each of the BIR-1 parts of the pulse. For a flip-angle of theta, the phase shift of each pulse is set by this design:

$\Delta\phi_1=180^\circ + \theta/2$; $\Delta\phi_2=-180^\circ + \theta/2$

The BIR-4 pulse with arbitrary flip-angle will always rotate M by theta about the initial direction of the B_{effective} field, which is not true of the BIR-1 pulse. This means that all flip-angles induced by BIR-4 pulses will lie in the same plane (if the initial B_{effective} is in the same direction for each of the BIR-4 pulses).

Off-resonance spins will exhibit some degree of spin-locking to the B_{effective} field, similarly to the BIR-1 case.

== Modulation Functions for Adiabatic Inversion Pulses ==
Many different combinations of phase and amplitude modulated pulses can perform similar adiabatic inversions. The selection and/or design of adiabatic pulses depends on the required adiabaticity of the application. Once a required adiabaticity is defined, the amplitude and phase functions can be optimized against several desired features, such as reduction in the total time of the pulse, insensitivity to off-resonance or constant gradient fields, and reduction in the peak power required in the B_{1} pulse.

We can examine the cases of AHP and AFP to demonstrate principles in adiabatic pulse design. In NMR excitation, it is desired to create offset-frequency-independent excitation with low RF peak power. Consider a spin which has an offset frequency of $\Delta \Omega$. The effective field experienced by this spin is given,

$$B_{effective} =\begin{bmatrix} A(t) \\ 0 \\ \frac{\omega_0+\Delta\Omega}{\gamma}-\frac{\omega(t)}{\gamma} \end{bmatrix}$$

The adiabaticity of an AHP pulse is given,

$K(\Delta\Omega,t) = \frac {\left \vert \gamma \left [ A^2(t) + \left ( B_0-\frac{\omega(t)}{\gamma} \right ) ^2 \right ]^{3/2} \right \vert} {\left \vert \frac{dA(t)}{dt} \left ( \frac{\omega_0+\Delta\Omega}{\gamma} \right ) - \frac{1}{\gamma} \frac{d\omega(t)}{dt} A(t) \right \vert}$

Considering the time $t_{\Delta\Omega}$, where $\left ( \left ( \omega_0+\Delta\Omega \right )-\omega(t_{\Delta\Omega}) \right )=0$ for a particular off-resonance, $\Delta\Omega$, the K-factor reduces to

$K(\Delta\Omega) = \frac {\gamma^2A^2(t_{\Delta\Omega})} {\frac{d\omega(t_{\Delta\Omega})}{dt}}$

This represents the time when the rotating reference frame is rotating in resonance with the frequency-shifted spin. At this time, correlated to the amount of off-resonance, the adiabaticity, K, is at a minimum for the off-resonant spin, which means it is a minimum constraint on the design of $A(t)$ and $\omega(t)$. One way to design $A(t)$ and $\omega(t)$ is to examine the minimum K-factor as a function of off-resonance. When this is done, the bandwidth of the adiabatic pulse can be defined by the width of off-resonance that still has a minimum K-factor greater than a minimum K-factor threshold. The pulses can be parameterized with desired constraints, such as pulse length or RF peak power, and the AHP pulse modulation functions can then be selected based on the desired application specifications.

== Applications and Current Research ==
Most applications of adiabatic pulse design are in MR spectroscopy or MR imaging where B_{1} inhomogeneity or effects like chemical shift cause significant errors. These applications include:

- Spectroscopy and imaging with surface coils that are used for both transmission and receiving.;;;
- Ultra-high-field NMR, which can induce non-magnetic resonances with non-trivial effects on B_{1} homogeneity
- Imaging in the presence of chemical-shift, where normal excitation would exhibit apparent spatial displacement (error in position) of off-resonant spins
- Spectroscopy and imaging applications that have constraints on RF peak power for excitation.

In addition, several research efforts have demonstrated methods for inverse design of adiabatic pulse sequences
