= QSM =

QSM is an acronym that may stand for:

- QuickSilver Scalable Multicast, a networking protocol
- Queen's Service Medal, a medal awarded by the government of New Zealand
- Quadriceps sparing myopathy, a common name for the hereditary inclusion body myopathy IBM2
- Quantitative susceptibility mapping, a medical imaging technique
