= Quantitative susceptibility mapping =

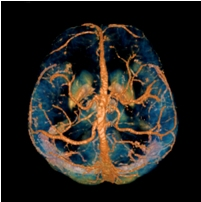
A volume rendered brain QSM acquired at 3 Tesla and reconstructed with morphology enabled dipole inversion (MEDI).

Quantitative susceptibility mapping (QSM) provides a novel contrast mechanism in magnetic resonance imaging (MRI) different from traditional susceptibility weighted imaging.

The voxel intensity in QSM is linearly proportional to the underlying tissue apparent magnetic susceptibility, which is useful for chemical identification and quantification of specific biomarkers including iron, calcium, gadolinium, and super paramagnetic iron oxide (SPIO) nano-particles. QSM utilizes phase images, solves the magnetic field to susceptibility source inverse problem, and generates a three-dimensional susceptibility distribution. Due to its quantitative nature and sensitivity to certain kinds of material, potential QSM applications include standardized quantitative stratification of cerebral microbleeds and neurodegenerative disease, accurate gadolinium quantification in contrast enhanced MRI, and direct monitoring of targeted theranostic drug biodistribution in nanomedicine.

== Background ==
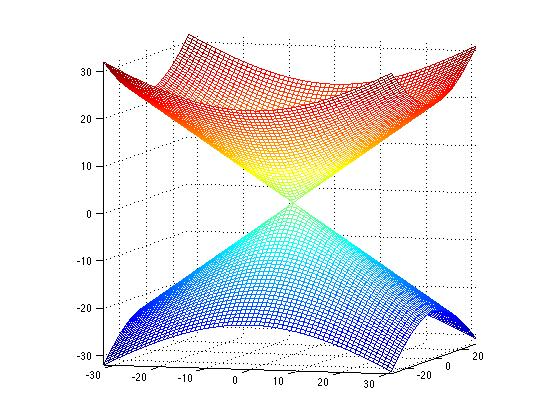
A visualization of the cone in Fourier domain.

In MRI, the local field $\delta B$ induced by non-ferromagnetic biomaterial susceptibility along the main polarization B_{0} field is the convolution of the volume susceptibility distribution $\chi$ with the dipole kernel $d$: $\delta B = d \otimes \chi$. This spatial convolution can be expressed as a point-wise multiplication in Fourier domain: $\Delta B = D \cdot \Chi$. This Fourier expression provides an efficient way to predict the field perturbation when the susceptibility distribution is known. However, the field to source inverse problem involves division by zero at a pair of cone surfaces at the magic angle with respect to B_{0} in the Fourier domain. Consequently, susceptibility is underdetermined at the spatial frequencies on the cone surface, which often leads to severe streaking artifacts in the reconstructed QSM.

== Techniques ==
=== Data acquisition ===
In principle, any 3D gradient echo sequence can be used for data acquisition. In practice, high resolution imaging with a moderately long echo time is preferred to obtain sufficient susceptibility effects, although the optimal imaging parameters depend on the specific applications and the field strength. A multi-echo acquisition is beneficial for accurate B_{0} field measurement without the contribution from B_{1} inhomogeneity. Flow compensation may further improve the accuracy of susceptibility measurement in venous blood, but there are certain technical difficulties to devise a fully flow compensated multi-echo sequence.

=== Background field removal ===
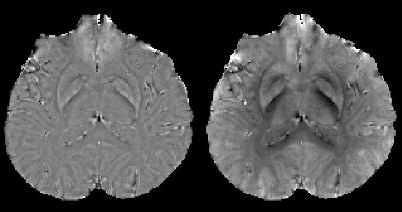
Estimated local field maps using left) high-pass filtering method, right) projection onto dipole fields (PDF) method.

In human brain quantitative susceptibility mapping, only the local susceptibility sources inside the brain are of interest. However, the magnetic field induced by the local sources is inevitably contaminated by the field induced by other sources such as main field inhomogeneity (imperfect shimming) and the air-tissue interface, whose susceptibility difference is orders of magnitudes stronger than that of the local sources. Therefore, the non-biological background field needs to be removed for clear visualization on phase images and precise quantification on QSM.

Ideally, the background field can be directly measured with a separate reference scan, where the sample of interest is replaced by a uniform phantom with the same shape while keeping the scanner shimming identical. However, for clinical application, such an approach is impossible and post-processing based methods are preferred. Traditional heuristic methods, including high-pass filtering, are useful for the background field removal, although they also tamper with the local field and degrade the quantitative accuracy.

More recent background field removal methods directly or indirectly exploit the fact that the background field is a harmonic function. Two recent methods based on physical principles, projection onto dipole fields (PDF) and sophisticated harmonic artifact reduction on phase data (SHARP), demonstrated improved contrast and higher precision on the estimated local field. Both methods model the background field as a magnetic field generated by an unknown background susceptibility distribution, and differentiate it from the local field using either the approximate orthogonality or the harmonic property. The background field can also be directly computed by solving the Laplace's equation with simplified boundary values, as demonstrated in the Laplacian boundary value (LBV) method.

=== Field-to-source inversion ===
The field-to-source inverse problem can be solved by several methods with various associated advantages and limitations.

==== Calculation of susceptibility through multiple orientation sampling (COSMOS) ====
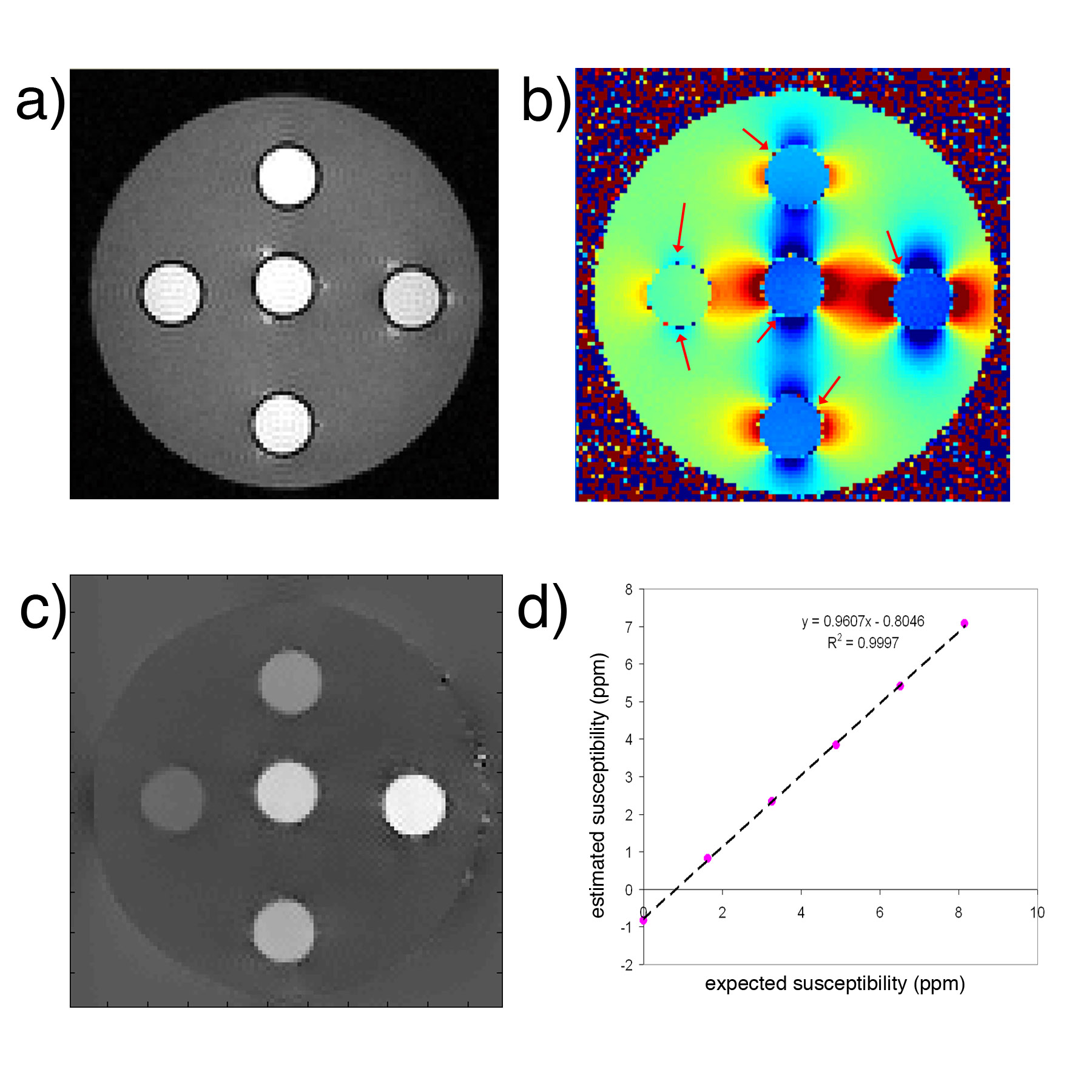
The first QSM image reconstructed using COSMOS to quantify gadolinium concentrations in vials. a) magnitude image; b) field map; c) QSM; d) linear regression.

COSMOS solves the inverse problem by oversampling from multiple orientations. COSMOS utilizes the fact that the zero cone surface in the Fourier domain is fixed at the magic angle with respect to the B_{0} field. Therefore, if an object is rotated with respect to the B_{0} field, then in the object's frame, the B_{0} field is rotated and thus the cone. Consequently, data that cannot be calculated due to the cone becomes available at the new orientations.

COSMOS assumes a model-free susceptibility distribution and keeps full fidelity to the measured data. This method has been validated extensively in in vitro, ex vivo and phantom experiments. Quantitative susceptibility maps obtained from in vivo human brain imaging also showed high degree of agreement with previous knowledge about brain anatomy. Three orientations are generally required for COSMOS, limiting the practicality for clinical applications. However, it may serve as a reference standard when available for calibrating other techniques.

==== Morphology enabled dipole inversion (MEDI) ====
A unique advantage of MRI is that it provides not only the phase image but also the magnitude image. In principle, the contrast change, or equivalently the edge, on a magnitude image arises from the underlying change of tissue type, which is the same cause for the change of susceptibility. This observation is translated into mathematics in MEDI, where edges in a QSM which do not exist in the corresponding magnitude image are sparsified by solving a weighted $l_1$ norm minimization problem.

MEDI has also been validated extensively in phantom, in vitro and ex vivo experiments. In an in vivo human brain, MEDI calculated QSM showed similar results compared to COSMOS without statistically significant difference. MEDI only requires a single angle acquisition, so it is a more practical solution to QSM.

==== Thresholded K-space division (TKD) ====
The underdetermined data in Fourier domain is only at the location of the cone and its immediate vicinity. For this region in k-space, spatial-frequencies of the dipole kernel are set to a predetermined non-zero value for the division. Investigation of more advanced strategies for recovering data in this k-space region is also a topic of ongoing research.

Thresholded k-space division only requires a single angle acquisition, and benefits from the ease of implementation as well as the fast calculation speed. However, streaking artifacts are frequently present in the QSM and the susceptibility value is underestimated compared to COSMOS calculated QSM.

== Potential clinical applications ==
=== Differentiating calcification from iron ===
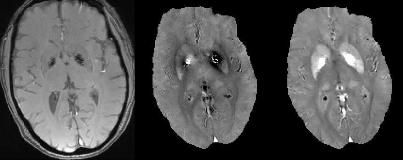
Differentiation between calcification and iron. From left to right are magnitude, phase and QSM.

It has been confirmed in in vivo and phantom experiments that cortical bones, whose major composition is calcification, are diamagnetic compared to water. Therefore, it is possible to use this diamagnetism to differentiate calcifications from iron deposits that usually demonstrate strong paramagnetism. This may allow QSM to serve as a problem solving tool for the diagnosis of confounding hypointense findings on T2* weighted images.

=== Quantification of contrast agent ===
For exogenous susceptibility sources, the susceptibility value is theoretically linearly proportional to the concentration of the contrast agent. This provides a new way for in vivo quantification of gadolinium or SPIO concentrations.
