= Gouy balance =

Measuring instrument in magnetism

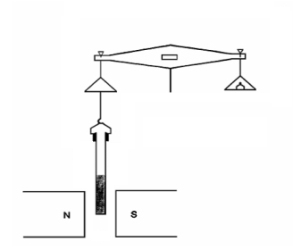
Schematic diagram of Gouy balance

The Gouy balance, invented by the French physicist Louis Georges Gouy, is a device for measuring the magnetic susceptibility of a sample. The Gouy balance operates on magnetic torque, by placing the sample on a horizontal arm or beam suspended by a thin fiber, and placing either a permanent magnet or electromagnet on the other end of the arm, there is a magnetic field applied to the system, causing the coil to experience a torque causing the arm to twist or rotate. The angle of rotation can then be calculated.

== Background ==
Amongst a wide range of interest in optics, Brownian motion, and experimental physics, Gouy also had a strong intrigue for the phenomena of magnetism. Gouy derived a mathematical expression showing that force is proportional to volume susceptibility for the interaction of material in a uniform magnetic field in 1889. From this derivation, Gouy proposed that balance measurements taken for tubes of material suspended in a magnetic field could evaluate his expression for volume susceptibility. Though Gouy never tested the scientific suggestion himself, this simple and inexpensive method became the foundation for measuring magnetic susceptibility and the blueprint for the Gouy balance.

Quincke made note in 1888 that liquid meniscuses within capillaries moved under the influences of magnetic fields, demonstrating that pressure changes may be related to its magnetic propensity. Gouy became interested by this hypothesis and subsequently formulated an interaction expression of materials within cylinder designations in uniform magnetic fields, displaying how the force would be proportional to volume susceptibility. He established his own hypothesis that measurements be made by tube materials being weighed in magnetic fields from a balance. For unknown reasons, he never introduced this concept himself, although it was eventually replicated by others over its simplicity, thus emerging as a regular means to measure magnetic susceptibility.

== Procedure ==
The Gouy balance measures the apparent change in the mass of the sample as it is repelled or attracted by the region of high magnetic field between the poles. Some commercially available balances have a port at their base for this application. In use, a long, cylindrical sample to be tested is suspended from a balance, partially entering between the poles of a magnet. The sample can be in solid or liquid form, and is often placed in a cylindrical container such as a test tube. Solid compounds are generally ground into a fine powder to allow for uniformity within the sample. The sample is suspended between the magnetic poles through an attached thread or string. The experimental procedure requires two separate reading to be performed. An initial balance reading is performed on the sample of interest without a magnetic field (m_{a}). A subsequent balance reading is taken with an applied magnetic field (m_{b}). The difference between these two readings relates to the magnetic force on the sample (m_{b} – m_{a}).

== Concept ==
The apparent change in mass from the two balance readings is a result of magnetic force on the sample. The magnetic force is applied across the gradient of a strong and weak magnetic field. A sample with a paramagnetic compound will be pulled down towards the magnetic, and provide a positive difference in apparent mass m_{b} – m_{a}. Diamagnetic compounds can either exhibit no apparent change in weight or a negative change as the sample is slightly repelled by the applied magnetic field. With a paramagnetic sample, the magnetic induction is stronger than the applied field and magnetic susceptibility is positive. A diamagnetic sample has a magnetic induction much weaker than the applied field, and a respective negative magnetic susceptibility. The following mathematical equation relates the apparent change in mass to the volume susceptibility of the sample:

$\text{F} = (m_b-m_a)g=\frac{1}{2}(K_2-K_1)AH^2$

- m_{b} – m_{a} = apparent difference in mass
- g = gravitational acceleration
- K_{1} = volume susceptibility of medium, usually air and of negligible value
- K_{2} = volume susceptibility of sample
- H = applied magnetic field
- A = area of the sample tube

== Instrument ==
In a practical device, the whole assembly of balance and magnet is enclosed in a glass box to ensure that the weight measurement is not affected by air currents. The sample can also be enclosed in a thermostat in order to make measurements at different temperatures. Since it requires a large and powerful electromagnet, the Gouy balance is a stationary instrument permanently set up on a bench. The apparatus is often placed on a marble balance table in a non-ventilated room to minimize the vibrations and disruption from the environment. The stationary magnetic of a Gouy balance is often an electromagnet connected to a power source, since balance recordings with and without the applied magnetic field are required of the procedure.

== See also ==
- Evans balance
- Faraday balance
- Kibble balance
