= Gouy phase shift =

Phemomenon of physical optics

The Gouy phase shift is a phase shift gradually acquired by a Gaussian beam around its beam waist (focus). It is named after Louis Georges Gouy.

== Calculations ==
At distance z from the waist of a Gaussian beam, the Gouy phase is given by
$$\psi(z) = \arctan \left( \frac{z}{z_\mathrm{R}} \right).$$

z_{R} is the Rayleigh range:

$$z_\mathrm{R} = \frac{\pi w_0^2 n}{\lambda},$$

where w_{0} is the radius of the beam at the waist, n is the index of refraction of the medium in which the beam propagates, and λ is the wavelength of the beam in free space.

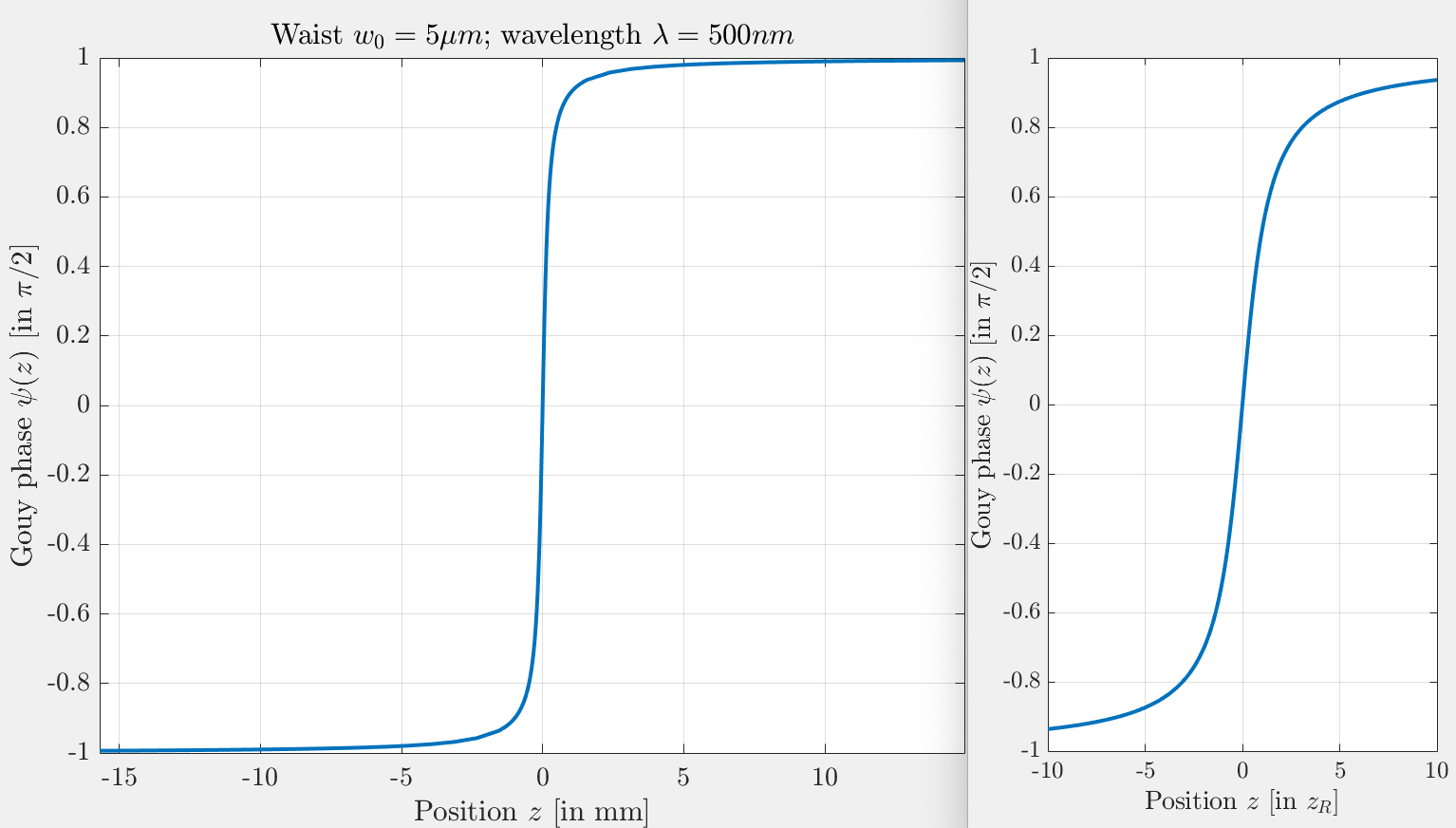
Gouy phase.

== Speed of light ==
The Gouy phase results in an increase in the apparent wavelength near the waist (z ≈ 0). Thus the phase velocity in that region formally exceeds the speed of light. That paradoxical behavior must be understood as a near-field phenomenon where the departure from the phase velocity of light (as would apply exactly to a plane wave) is small except in the case of a beam with large numerical aperture, in which case the wavefronts' curvature changes substantially over the interval of a single wavelength. In all cases the wave equation is satisfied at every position.

The sign of the Gouy phase depends on the sign convention chosen for the electric field phasor. With e^{iωt} dependence, the Gouy phase changes from -π/2 to +π/2, while with e^{-iωt} dependence it changes from +π/2 to -π/2 along the axis.

For a fundamental Gaussian beam, the Gouy phase results in a net phase discrepancy with respect to the speed of light amounting to π radians (thus a phase reversal) as one moves from the far field on one side of the waist to the far field on the other side. This phase variation is not observable in most experiments. It is, however, of theoretical importance and takes on a greater range for higher-order Gaussian modes.
