= Susceptibility weighted imaging =

MRI sequence sensitive to venous blood, hemorrhage and iron storage

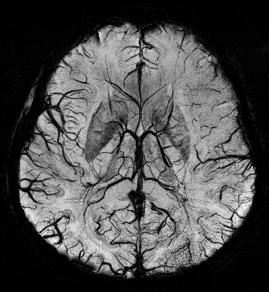
SWI Image acquired at 4 tesla showing the veins in the brain.

Susceptibility weighted imaging (SWI), originally called BOLD venographic imaging, is an MRI sequence that is exquisitely sensitive to venous blood, hemorrhage and iron storage. SWI uses a fully flow compensated, long echo, gradient recalled echo (GRE) pulse sequence to acquire images. This method exploits the susceptibility differences between tissues and uses the phase image to detect these differences. The magnitude and phase data are combined to produce an enhanced contrast magnitude image. The imaging of venous blood with SWI is a blood-oxygen-level dependent (BOLD) technique which is why it was (and is sometimes still) referred to as BOLD venography. Due to its sensitivity to venous blood SWI is commonly used in traumatic brain injuries (TBI) and for high resolution brain venographies but has many other clinical applications. SWI is offered as a clinical package by Philips and Siemens but can be run on any manufacturer's machine at field strengths of 1.0 T, 1.5 T, 3.0 T and higher.

== Acquisition and image processing ==
SWI uses a fully velocity compensated, RF spoiled, high-resolution, 3D gradient recalled echo (GRE) scan. Both the magnitude and phase images are saved, and the phase image is high pass (HP) filtered to remove unwanted artifacts. The magnitude image is then combined with the phase image to create an enhanced contrast magnitude image referred to as the susceptibility weighted (SW) image. It is also common to create minimum intensity projections (mIP) over 8 to 10 mm to better visualize vein connectivity. In this way four sets of images are generated, the original magnitude, HP filtered phase, susceptibility weighted, and mIPs over the susceptibility weighted images.

=== Phase filtering ===
The values in the phase images are constrained from -π to π so if the value goes above π it wraps to -π, inhomogeneities in the magnetic field cause low frequency background gradients. This causes all the phase values to slowly increase across the image which creates phase wrapping and obscures the image. This type of artifact can be removed by phase unwrapping or by high pass filtering the original complex data to remove the low frequency variations in the phase image.

=== Susceptibility weighted image creation ===
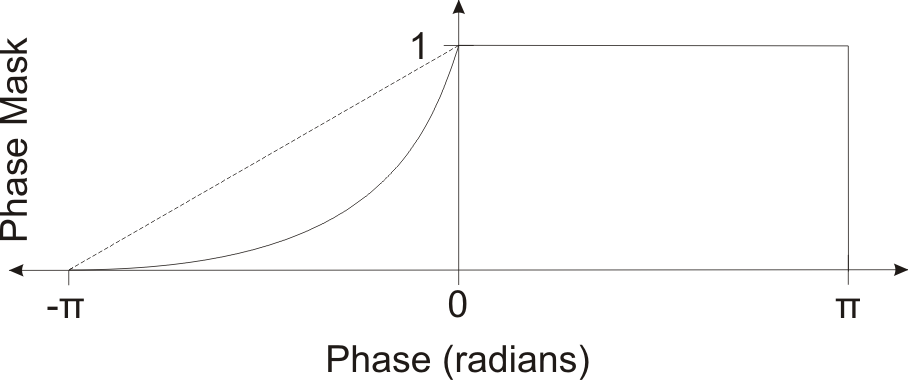
A phase mask sensitive to negative phase values with a linear (dashed line) and 4th power mapping (solid line)

The susceptibility weighted image is created by combining the magnitude and filtered phase images. A mask is created from the phase image by mapping all values above 0 radians to be 1 and linearly mapping values from -π to 0 radians to range from 0 to 1, respectively. Alternatively, a power function (typically 4th degree) can be used instead of a linear mapping from -π to 0 to increase the effect of the mask. The magnitude image is then multiplied by this mask. In this way phase values above 0 radians have no effect and phase values below 0 radians darken the magnitude image. This increases the contrast in the magnitude image for objects with low phase values such as veins, iron, and hemorrhage.

== Clinical applications ==
SWI is most commonly used to detect small amounts of hemorrhage or calcium. Clinical applications are under research in different fields of medicine.

=== Traumatic brain injury (TBI) ===
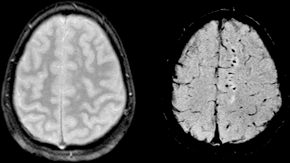
Comparison of diffuse axonal injury imaged with conventional GRE (left) and SWI (right) at 1.5 T

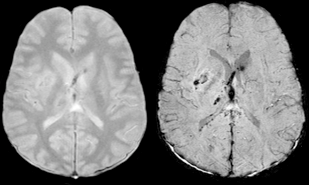
Comparison of hemorrhage imaged with conventional GRE (left) and SWI (right) at 1.5 T

The detection of micro-hemorrhages, shearing, and diffuse axonal injury (DAI) in trauma patients is often difficult as the injuries tend to be relatively small in size and can be easily missed by low resolution scans. SWI is usually run at relatively high resolution (1 mm^{3}) and is extremely sensitive to bleeding in the gray matter/white matter boundaries making it is possible to see very small lesions increasing the ability to detect more subtle injuries.

=== Stroke and hemorrhage ===
Diffusion weighted imaging offers a powerful means to detect acute stroke. Although it is well known that gradient echo imaging can detect hemorrhage, it is best detected with SWI. In the example shown here, the gradient echo image shows the region of likely cytotoxic edema whereas the SW image shows the likely localization of the stroke and the vascular territory affected (data acquired at 1.5 T).

The bright region in the gradient echo weighted image shows the area affected in this acute stroke example. The arrows in the SWI image may show the tissue at risk that has been affected by the stroke (A, B, C) and the location of the stroke itself (D). The reason that we are able to see the affected vascular territory could be because there is a reduced level of oxygen saturation in this tissue, suggesting that the flow to this region of the brain could be reduced post stroke. Another possible explanation is that there is an increase in local venous blood volume. In either case, this image suggests that the tissue associated with this vascular territory could be tissue at risk. Future stroke research will involve comparisons of perfusion weighted imaging and SWI to learn more about local flow and oxygen saturation.

=== Sturge–Weber disease ===
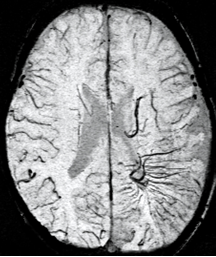
SWI venogram of a neonate with Sturge–Weber syndrome

An SWI venogram of a neonate with Sturge–Weber syndrome who did not display neurological symptoms is shown to the right. The initial conventional MR imaging methods did not demonstrate any abnormality. The abnormal venous vasculature in the left occipital lobe extending between the posterior horn of the ventricle and the cortical surface is clearly visible in the venogram. Due to the high resolution even collaterals can be resolved.

=== Tumors ===
Part of the characterization of tumors lies in understanding the angiographic behavior of lesions both from the perspective of angiogenesis and micro-hemorrhages. Aggressive tumors tend to have rapidly growing vasculature and many micro-hemorrhages. Hence, the ability to detect these changes in the tumor could lead to a better determination of the tumor status. The enhanced sensitivity of SWI to venous blood and blood products due to their differences in susceptibility compared to normal tissue leads to better contrast in detecting tumor boundaries and tumor hemorrhage.

=== Multiple sclerosis ===
Multiple sclerosis (MS) is usually studied with FLAIR and contrast enhanced T1 imaging. SWI adds to this by revealing the venous connectivity in some lesions and presents evidence of iron in some lesions. This key new information may help understand the physiology of MS.

The magnetic resonance frequency measured with an SWI scan was shown to be sensitive to MS lesion formation. The frequency increases months before a new lesion appears on a contrast enhanced scan. At the time of contrast enhancement the frequency increases rapidly and remains elevated for at least six months.

=== Vascular dementia and cerebral amyloid angiopathy (CAA) ===
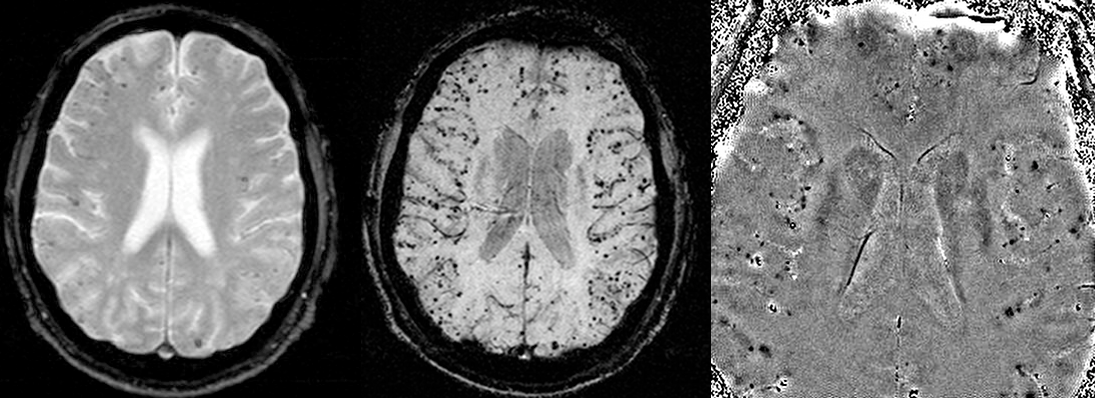
Images of CAA collected at 1.5 T. Left, conventional T2* (TE=20 ms), center, SWI processed magnitude image (TE=40 ms) and right, SWI phase image (TE=40 ms)

Gradient recalled echo (GRE) imaging is the conventional way to detect hemorrhage in CAA, however SWI is a much more sensitive technique that can reveal many micro-hemorrhages that are missed on GRE images. A conventional gradient echo T2*-weighted image (left, TE=20 ms) shows some low-signal foci associated with CAA. On the other hand, an SWI image (center, with a resolution of 0.5 mm x 0.5 mm x 2.0 mm, projected over 8mm) shows many more associated low-signal foci. Phase images were used to enhance the effect of the local hemosiderin build-up. An example phase image (right) with yet higher resolution of 0.25 mm x 0.25 mm x 2.0 mm shows a clear ability to localize multiple CAA-associated foci.

=== Pneumocephalus ===
Recent studies suggest that SWI might be suitable for monitorizing neurosurgical patients recovering from Pneumocephalus, as air can be easily detected with SWI.

== High field SWI ==
SWI is uniquely suited to take advantage of higher field systems, as the contrast in the phase image is linearly proportional to echo time (TE) and field strength. Higher fields thus allow shorter echo times without a loss of contrast which can reduce scan time and motion related artifacts. The high signal-to-noise available at higher fields also increases scan quality and allows for higher resolution scans.

== See also ==
- Magnetic resonance angiography
- Quantitative susceptibility mapping
