= Faraday balance =

Device for measuring magnetism of an object

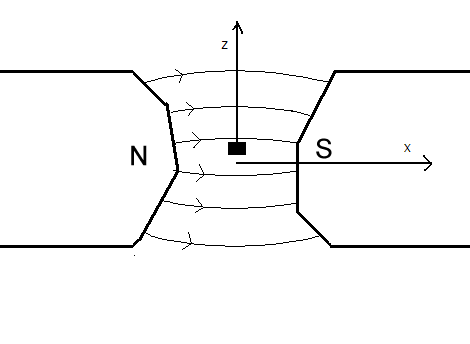
Diagram of Faraday balance in a magnetic field

A Faraday balance is a device used to measure magnetic susceptibility, a property of matter is related to the force experienced by a substance in a magnetic field. Various practical devices are available for the measurement of susceptibility, with differences in the shape of the field and the way the force is measured.

In the Faraday balance, the magnetic field is homogeneous. The pole pieces of the magnet are shaped so that there is a region in which the product of the field strength and the field gradient in the z direction is constant; the sample to be measured is placed in this region. The force in this case is independent of the packing of the sample and depends only on the total mass of the material present. The method is sensitive and highly reproducible, and can be applied to single crystals. The force is measured as a weight change using a torsion balance.

An alternative method for measuring magnetic susceptibility is the Gouy balance. In this technique there is an inhomogeneous magnetic field in the central region between two (flat) poles of a magnet, either a permanent magnet or an electromagnet. The sample must be in powder form and is placed in a cylindrical tube, which is then suspended in such a way that one end lies in the centre of the field and the other is effectively outside the magnetic field. However, errors caused by inefficient packing in the sample tube are difficult to eliminate.
