= Louis Georges Gouy =

French physicist (1854–1926)

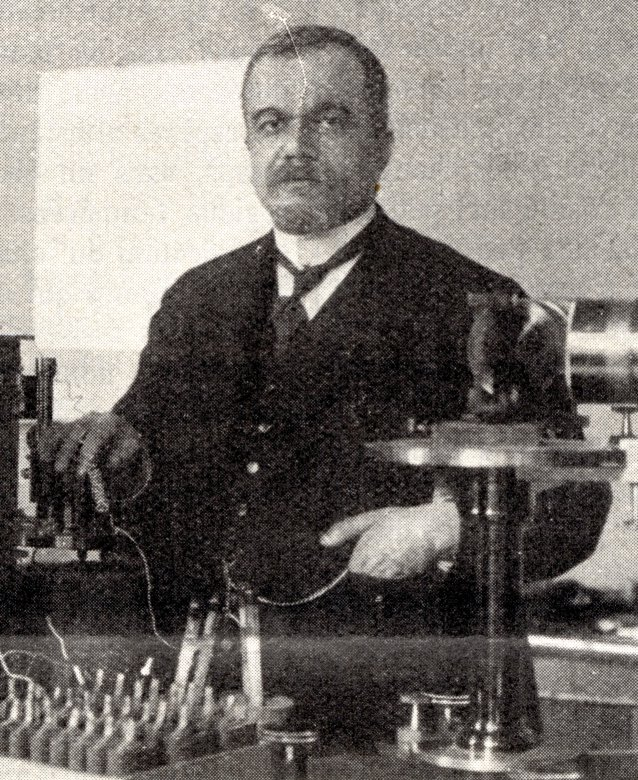
- Born: February 19, 1854; Vals-les-Bains, Ardèche, France
- Died: January 27, 1926 (aged 71)
- Known for: Gouy balance Gouy phase Gouy–Chapman electric double layer model Gouy–Stodola theorem
- Scientific career
- Fields: Physics

Louis Georges Gouy (February 19, 1854 – January 27, 1926) was a French physicist. He is the namesake of the Gouy balance, the Gouy–Chapman electric double layer model (which is a relatively successful albeit limited model that describes the electrical double-layer which finds applications in vast areas of studies from physical chemistry to biophysics) and the Gouy phase.

Gouy was born at Vals-les-Bains, Ardèche in 1854. He became a correspondent of the Académie des sciences in 1901, and a member in 1913.

== Topics investigated ==
His principal scientific work was related to the following subjects:

- The propagation velocity of light waves in dispersive media
- Propagation of spherical waves of small radius
- Distant diffraction (angles of dispersion reaching 150°)
- Electrostatics: Inductive capacity of dielectrics
- Surface charge
- Effect of the magnetic field on the discharge in rarefied gases
- Electrocapillarity
- Emission capacity of absorbent of the coloured flames
- Brownian motion
- Measurement of magnetic susceptibility of transition metal complexes with Gouy balance
- The gouy phase shift, a feature of Gaussian beams

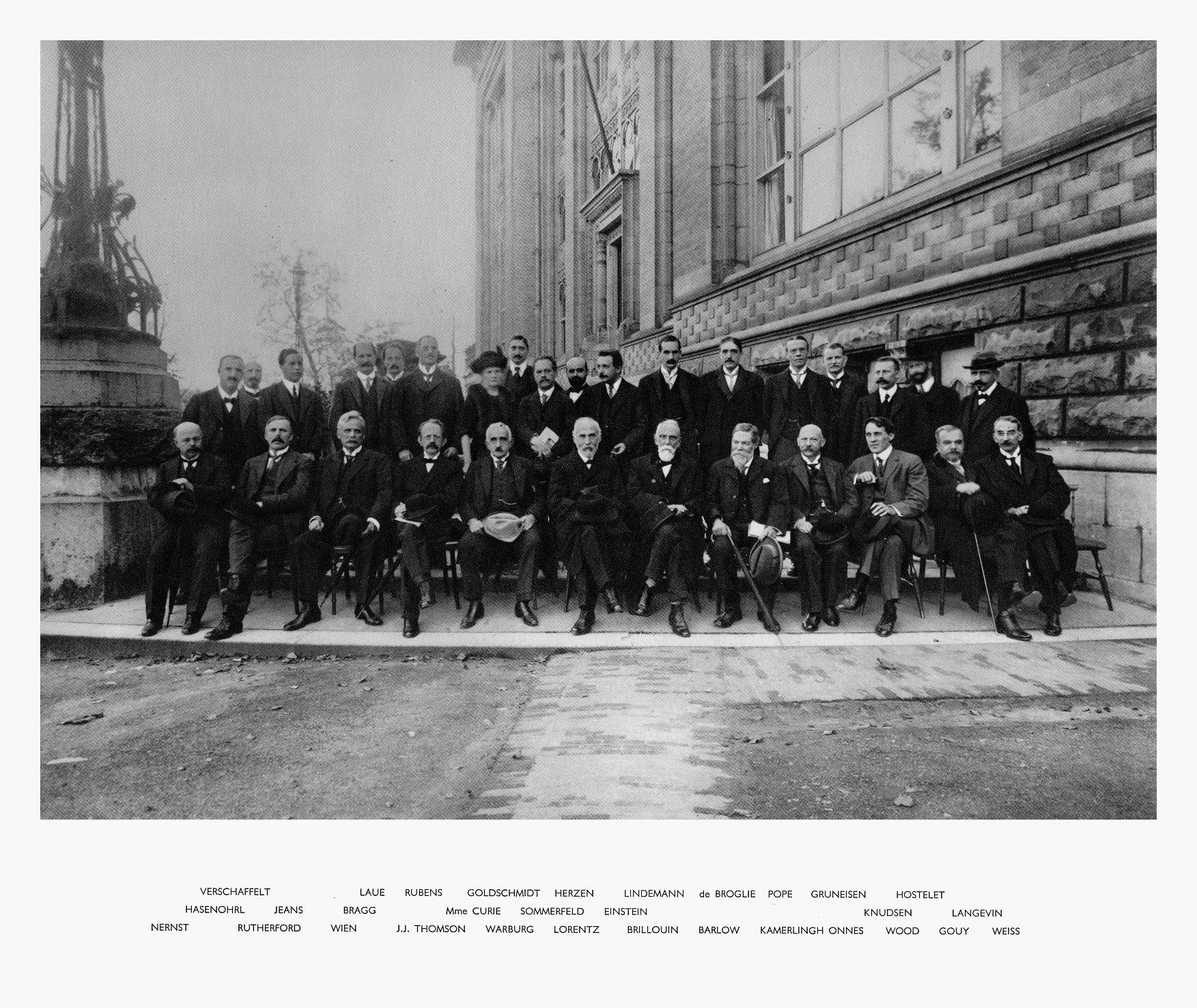
Solvay conference of 1913. Louis Georges Gouy is in the first row on the right

== See also ==
- Gouy–Stodola theorem
