= B₀ =

B_{0}, that is "B subscript zero", is also generally used in Magnetic Resonance Imaging to denote the net magnetization vector. Although in physics and mathematics the notation to represent a physical quantity can be arbitrary, it is generally accepted in the literature, such as the International Society for Magnetic Resonance in Medicine that B_{0} represents net magnetization. This is particularly prominent in areas of science where magnetic fields are important such as spectroscopy. By convention, B_{0} is interpreted as a vector quantity pointing the z-direction, with subsequent x and y cartesian axes oriented with the right hand rule.

B_{0} is also the symbol often used to denote the reference magnetization in which equations with electromagnetic fields are normalized.
