= Magnetic susceptibility =

Degree to which a material becomes magnetized in an applied magnetic field

In electromagnetism, the magnetic susceptibility (from Latin susceptibilis 'receptive'; denoted χ, chi) is a measure of how much a material will become magnetized in an applied magnetic field. It is the ratio of magnetization M (magnetic moment per unit volume) to the applied magnetic field intensity H. This allows a simple classification, into two categories, of most materials' responses to an applied magnetic field: an alignment with the magnetic field, χ > 0, called paramagnetism, or an alignment against the field, χ < 0, called diamagnetism.

Magnetic susceptibility indicates whether a material is attracted into or repelled out of a magnetic field. Paramagnetic materials align with the applied field and are attracted to regions of greater magnetic field. Diamagnetic materials are anti-aligned and are pushed away, toward regions of lower magnetic fields. On top of the applied field, the magnetization of the material adds its own magnetic field, causing the field lines to concentrate in paramagnetism, or be excluded in diamagnetism. Quantitative measures of the magnetic susceptibility also provide insights into the structure of materials, providing insight into bonding and energy levels. Furthermore, it is widely used in geology for paleomagnetic studies and structural geology.

The magnetizability of materials comes from the atomic-level magnetic properties of the particles of which they are made. Usually, this is dominated by the magnetic moments of electrons. Electrons are present in all materials, but without any external magnetic field, the magnetic moments of the electrons are usually either paired up or random so that the overall magnetism is zero (the exception to this usual case is ferromagnetism). The fundamental reasons why the magnetic moments of the electrons line up or do not are very complex and cannot be explained by classical physics. However, a useful simplification is to measure the magnetic susceptibility of a material and apply the macroscopic form of Maxwell's equations. This allows classical physics to make useful predictions while avoiding the underlying quantum mechanical details.

== Definition ==
=== Volume susceptibility ===
Magnetic susceptibility is a dimensionless proportionality constant that indicates the degree of magnetization of a material in response to an applied magnetic field. A related term is magnetizability, the proportion between magnetic moment and (vacuum) magnetic field. A closely related parameter is the permeability, which expresses the total magnetization of material and volume.

The volume magnetic susceptibility, represented by the symbol χ_{v} (often simply χ, sometimes χ_{m} – magnetic, to distinguish from the electric susceptibility), is defined in the International System of Quantities, which underlies the SI – in other systems there may be additional constants – by the following relationship:
$$\mathbf{M}\ {\stackrel{\text{linear}}{=}}\ \chi_\text{v} \mathbf{H},$$

M is the magnetization of the material (the magnetic dipole moment per unit volume), with unit amperes per meter, and
H is the strength of the auxiliary magnetic field, also with the unit amperes per meter.
χ_{v} is therefore a dimensionless quantity.

Using SI units, the magnetic field B is related to H by the relationship
$$\mathbf{B} = \mu_0(\mathbf{H} + \mathbf{M})\ {\stackrel{\text{linear}}{=}}\ \mu_0 (1 + \chi_\text{v}) \mathbf{H} = \mu \mathbf{H},$$
where μ_{0} is the vacuum permeability (see table of physical constants), and (1 + χ_{v}) is the relative permeability of the material. Thus the volume magnetic susceptibility χ_{v} and the magnetic permeability μ are related by the following formula:
$$\mu\ {\stackrel{\text{def}}{=}}\ \mu_0 (1 + \chi_\text{v}).$$

Sometimes an auxiliary quantity called intensity of magnetization I (also referred to as magnetic polarisation J) and with unit teslas, is defined as
$$\mathbf{I}\ {\stackrel{\mathrm{def}}{=}}\ \mu_0 \mathbf{M}.$$

This allows an alternative description of all magnetization phenomena in terms of the quantities I and B, as opposed to the commonly used M and H.

=== Molar susceptibility and mass susceptibility ===
There are two other measures of susceptibility, the molar magnetic susceptibility (χ_{m}) with unit m^{3}/mol, and the mass magnetic susceptibility (χ_{ρ}) with unit m^{3}/kg that are defined below, where ρ is the density with unit kg/m^{3} and M is molar mass with unit kg/mol:
$$\begin{align}
\chi_\rho &= \frac{\chi_\text{v}}{\rho}; \\
\chi_\text{m} &= M\chi_\rho = \frac{M}{\rho} \chi_\text{v}.
\end{align}$$

=== In CGS units ===
The definitions above are according to the International System of Quantities (ISQ) upon which the SI is based. However, many tables of magnetic susceptibility give the values of the corresponding quantities of the CGS system (more specifically CGS-EMU, short for electromagnetic units, or Gaussian-CGS; both are the same in this context). The quantities characterizing the permeability of free space for each system have different defining equations:
$$\mathbf{B}^\text{CGS} = \mathbf{H}^\text{CGS} + 4\pi\mathbf{M}^\text{CGS} = \left(1 + 4\pi\chi_\text{v}^\text{CGS}\right) \mathbf{H}^\text{CGS} .$$

The respective CGS susceptibilities are multiplied by 4π to give the corresponding ISQ quantities (often referred to as SI quantities) with the same units:
$$\chi_\text{m}^\text{SI} = 4\pi\chi_\text{m}^\text{CGS}$$
$$\chi_\text{ρ}^\text{SI} = 4\pi\chi_\text{ρ}^\text{CGS}$$
$$\chi_\text{v}^\text{SI} = 4\pi\chi_\text{v}^\text{CGS}$$

For example, the CGS volume magnetic susceptibility of water at 20 °C is 7.19×10^{−7}, which is 9.04×10^{−6} using the SI convention, both quantities being dimensionless. Whereas for most electromagnetic quantities, which system of quantities it belongs to can be disambiguated by incompatibility of their units, this is not true for the susceptibility quantities.

In physics it is common to see CGS mass susceptibility with unit cm^{3}/g or emu/g⋅Oe^{−1}, and the CGS molar susceptibility with unit cm^{3}/mol or emu/mol⋅Oe^{−1}.

== Paramagnetism and diamagnetism ==
If χ is positive, a material can be paramagnetic. In this case, the magnetic field in the material is strengthened by the induced magnetization. Alternatively, if χ is negative, the material is diamagnetic. In this case, the magnetic field in the material is weakened by the induced magnetization. Generally, nonmagnetic materials are said to be para- or diamagnetic because they do not possess permanent magnetization without external magnetic field. Ferromagnetic, ferrimagnetic, or antiferromagnetic materials possess permanent magnetization even without external magnetic field and do not have a well defined zero-field susceptibility.

== Experimental measurement ==
Volume magnetic susceptibility is measured by the force change felt upon a substance when a magnetic field gradient is applied. Early measurements are made using the Gouy balance where a sample is hung between the poles of an electromagnet. The change in weight when the electromagnet is turned on is proportional to the susceptibility. Today, high-end measurement systems use a superconductive magnet. An alternative is to measure the force change on a strong compact magnet upon insertion of the sample. This system, widely used today, is called the Evans balance. For liquid samples, the susceptibility can be measured from the dependence of the NMR frequency of the sample on its shape or orientation.

Another method using NMR techniques measures the magnetic field distortion around a sample immersed in water inside an MR scanner. This method is highly accurate for diamagnetic materials with susceptibilities similar to water.

== Tensor susceptibility ==
The magnetic susceptibility of most crystals is not a scalar quantity. Magnetic response M is dependent upon the orientation of the sample and can occur in directions other than that of the applied field H. In these cases, volume susceptibility is defined as a tensor:
$$M_i = H_j \chi_{ij}$$
where i and j refer to the directions (e.g., of the x and y Cartesian coordinates) of the applied field and magnetization, respectively. The tensor is thus degree 2 (second order), dimension (3,3) describing the component of magnetization in the ith direction from the external field applied in the jth direction.

== Differential susceptibility ==
In ferromagnetic crystals, the relationship between M and H is not linear. To accommodate this, a more general definition of differential susceptibility is used:
$$\chi^{d}_{ij} = \frac{\partial M_i}{\partial H_j}$$
where χ^{d}_{ij} is a tensor derived from partial derivatives of components of M with respect to components of H. When the coercivity of the material parallel to an applied field is the smaller of the two, the differential susceptibility is a function of the applied field and self interactions, such as the magnetic anisotropy. When the material is not saturated, the effect will be nonlinear and dependent upon the domain wall configuration of the material.

Several experimental techniques allow for the measurement of the electronic properties of a material. An important effect in metals under strong magnetic fields, is the oscillation of the differential susceptibility as function of 1/H. This behaviour is known as the De Haas–Van Alphen effect and relates the period of the susceptibility with the Fermi surface of the material.

An analogue non-linear relation between magnetization and magnetic field happens for antiferromagnetic materials.

== In the frequency domain ==
When the magnetic susceptibility is measured in response to an AC magnetic field (i.e. a magnetic field that varies sinusoidally), this is called AC susceptibility. AC susceptibility (and the closely related "AC permeability") are complex number quantities, and various phenomena, such as resonance, can be seen in AC susceptibility that cannot occur in constant-field (DC) susceptibility. In particular, when an AC field is applied perpendicular to the detection direction (called the "transverse susceptibility" regardless of the frequency), the effect has a peak at the ferromagnetic resonance frequency of the material with a given static applied field. Currently, this effect is called the microwave permeability or network ferromagnetic resonance in the literature. These results are sensitive to the domain wall configuration of the material and eddy currents.

In terms of ferromagnetic resonance, the effect of an AC-field applied along the direction of the magnetization is called parallel pumping.

== Table of examples ==
Magnetic susceptibility of some materials
Material	Temp.	Pressure	Molar susceptibility		Mass susceptibility		Volume susceptibility		Molar mass	Density
Material	(°C)	(atm)	χ^{SI}_{m} (m^{3}/mol)	χ^{CGS}_{m} (cm^{3}/mol)	χ^{SI}_{ρ} (m^{3}/kg)	χ^{CGS}_{ρ} (cm^{3}/g)	χ^{SI}_{v} (1)	χ^{CGS}_{v} (1)	M (g/mol)	ρ (g/cm^{3})
Helium	20	1	−2.38×10^{−11}	−1.89×10^{−6}	−5.93×10^{−9}	−4.72×10^{−7}	−9.85×10^{−10}	−7.84×10^{−11}	4.0026	1.66×10^{−4}
Xenon	20	1	−5.71×10^{−10}	−4.54×10^{−5}	−4.35×10^{−9}	−3.46×10^{−7}	−2.37×10^{−8}	−1.89×10^{−9}	131.29	5.46×10^{−3}
Oxygen	20	0.209	+4.3×10^{−8}	+3.42×10^{−3}	+1.34×10^{−6}	+1.07×10^{−4}	+3.73×10^{−7}	+2.97×10^{−8}	31.99	2.78×10^{−4}
Nitrogen	20	0.781	−1.56×10^{−10}	−1.24×10^{−5}	−5.56×10^{−9}	−4.43×10^{−7}	−5.06×10^{−9}	−4.03×10^{−10}	28.01	9.10×10^{−4}
Air (NTP)	20	1					+3.6×10^{−7}	+2.9×10^{−8}	28.97	1.29×10^{−3}
Water	20	1	−1.631×10^{−10}	−1.298×10^{−5}	−9.051×10^{−9}	−7.203×10^{−7}	−9.035×10^{−6}	−7.190×10^{−7}	18.015	0.9982
Paraffin oil, 220–260 cSt	22	1			−1.01×10^{−8}	−8.0×10^{−7}	−8.8×10^{−6}	−7.0×10^{−7}		0.878
PMMA	22	1			−7.61×10^{−9}	−6.06×10^{−7}	−9.06×10^{−6}	−7.21×10^{−7}		1.190
PVC	22	1			−7.80×10^{−9}	−6.21×10^{−7}	−1.071×10^{−5}	−8.52×10^{−7}		1.372
Fused silica glass	22	1			−5.12×10^{−9}	−4.07×10^{−7}	−1.128×10^{−5}	−8.98×10^{−7}		2.20
Diamond	r.t.	1	−7.4×10^{−11}	−5.9×10^{−6}	−6.2×10^{−9}	−4.9×10^{−7}	−2.2×10^{−5}	−1.7×10^{−6}	12.01	3.513
Graphite χ_{⊥}	r.t.	1	−7.5×10^{−11}	−6.0×10^{−6}	−6.3×10^{−9}	−5.0×10^{−7}	−1.4×10^{−5}	−1.1×10^{−6}	12.01	2.267
Graphite χ_{∥}	r.t.	1	−3.2×10^{−9}	−2.6×10^{−4}	−2.7×10^{−7}	−2.2×10^{−5}	−6.1×10^{−4}	−4.9×10^{−5}	12.01	2.267
Graphite χ_{∥}	−173	1	−4.4×10^{−9}	−3.5×10^{−4}	−3.6×10^{−7}	−2.9×10^{−5}	−8.3×10^{−4}	−6.6×10^{−5}	12.01	2.267
Aluminium		1	+2.2×10^{−10}	+1.7×10^{−5}	+7.9×10^{−9}	+6.3×10^{−7}	+2.2×10^{−5}	+1.75×10^{−6}	26.98	2.70
Silver	961	1	−2.3×10^{−10}	−1.8×10^{−5}			−2.31×10^{−5}	−1.84×10^{−6}	107.87	
Bismuth	20	1	−3.55×10^{−9}	−2.82×10^{−4}	−1.70×10^{−8}	−1.35×10^{−6}	−1.66×10^{−4}	−1.32×10^{−5}	208.98	9.78
Copper	20	1			−1.0785×10^{−9}		−9.63×10^{−6}	−7.66×10^{−7}	63.546	8.92
Nickel	20	1					600	48	58.69	8.9
Iron	20	1					200000	15900	55.847	7.874

== Sources of published data ==
The CRC Handbook of Chemistry and Physics has one of the few published magnetic susceptibility tables. The data are listed as CGS quantities. The molar susceptibility of several elements and compounds are listed in the CRC. Another compilation of magnetic susceptibility data is published in Tables of Physical Values (Таблицы физических величин), 1976.

== Application in the geosciences ==
In Earth science, magnetism is a useful parameter to describe and analyze rocks. Additionally, the anisotropy of magnetic susceptibility (AMS) within a sample determines parameters as directions of paleocurrents, maturity of paleosol, flow direction of magma injection, tectonic strain, etc. It is a non-destructive tool which quantifies the average alignment and orientation of magnetic particles within a sample.

== Application in oil exploration ==
In oil exploration, magnetic susceptibility can determine prospective hydrocarbon deposites. In 2014, a research conducted in western Ukraine revealed that prospective hydrocarbon deposit locations presented higher values of mass-specific magnetic susceptibility that was calculated in laboratory from rock samples obtained on field. Moreover, magnetic susceptibility can distinguish crude oil from different worldwide oil reservoir. Measuring magnetic susceptibility, it is possible to quantify clay content in clastic shoreface reservoir; minerals as illite and quartz can be measured through mass magnetic susceptibility, high amounts of these components are highly correlated with the presence of clay contents into the reservoir. Final results show that magnetic susceptibility measurements have good correspondences compared with traditional methods of measuring minerals in rocks as gamma ray and XDR.

Furthermore, magnetic susceptibility can characterize permeability of reservoir rock. Comparing low field and high field magnetic susceptibility measurements, in the high ones exists a higher correlation between the magnetic susceptibility and the permeability of the reservoir. In a shoreface North Sea oil reservoir was observed a slightly higher correlation with permeability in high field susceptibility (Potter and Ivakhnenko, 2008), and a much higher correlation with permeability and porosity in an Arab-D carbonate reservoir (Potter et al., 2011).

== See also ==
- Curie's law
- Electric susceptibility
- Iron
- Magnetic flux density
- Magnetochemistry
- Magnetometer
- Maxwell's equations
- Paleomagnetism
- Permeability (electromagnetism)
- Quantitative susceptibility mapping
- Susceptibility weighted imaging
