= Jonas Obleser =

German neuroscientist (born 1975)

- Born: Jonas Obleser; 10 April 1975 (age 51); Waiblingen, Germany
- Education: University of Konstanz
- Known for: Neuroscience; Psychology; Audiology
- Scientific career
- Fields: Cognitive neuroscience; Human communication
- Thesis: Neurobiology of Speech Perception: Evidence from Functional Brain Mapping (2004)
- Doctoral advisor: Carsten Eulitz Thomas Elbert Aditi Lahiri

Jonas Obleser (born 1975 in Waiblingen) is a German psychologist and neuroscientist.

== Academic career ==
Jonas Obleser studied psychology at the University of Konstanz and received his diploma in psychology in 2001. In 2004 he was awarded a doctorate (Dr. rer. nat.) from the University of Konstanz.

After research stays with Aditi Lahiri (Konstanz), Sophie Scott (London) and Angela Friederici (Max Planck Institute for Human Cognitive and Brain Sciences), he was appointed as a Max Planck Research Group leader and set up the research group "Auditory Cognition" at the Max Planck Institute for Human Cognitive and Brain Sciences in Leipzig, Germany.

In 2015, Jonas Obleser was appointed Professor at the University of Lübeck, Department of Psychology. He holds a Chair in Physiological Psychology and Research Methods and is a member of the Center of Brain, Behavior, and Metabolism (CBBM).

As of 2025, Jonas Obleser serves as senior editor for the journal Journal of Neuroscience, and has been serving as handling editor for NeuroImage and eLife.

== Research ==
Jonas Obleser's research is focussed on the neural dynamics of communication, using mainly audition as a “model system”. He has contributed to understanding the links of auditory cortex to more distributed, Large scale brain networks, using fMRI, EEG, MEG, computational neuroscience and psychophysics techniques.

Jonas Obleser's research interests range from processes underlying human cognition and perception, to translational aspects of ageing, to methodological and statistical aspects of neuroscience research. The neural processing of speech and age-related changes therein are central components of his research.

In 2024, Jonas Obleser led efforts to acquire a dedicated research building centred around questions of how humans and artificially intelligent agents interact in complex environments (“Lübeck environment for minds and machines in interaction”, LEMMI) for the University of Lübeck.

Jonas Obleser is the (co-)author of over 150 scientific publications.

== Honours ==
From 2024 on, Jonas Obleser serves as elected member of the Fachkollegium Neurowissenschaften of the German Research Foundation (DFG).

In 2015, Jonas Obleser was awarded an ERC Consolidator Grant. As part of this project, he and his research group are investigating the mechanisms of neuronal adaptation in the ageing listening brain.

In 2014, Obleser won the Young Investigator Spotlight Award of the Advances and Perspectives in Auditory Neuroscience Symposium (APAN).

In 2010, Jonas Obleser was awarded a 5-year grant for a Max Planck Research Group.
