= Edith Turner (anthropologist) =

Anthropologist

Edith Turner (June 17, 1921 – June 18, 2016) was an English-American anthropologist, poet, and post-secondary educator. In addition to collaborating with her husband, Victor Witter Turner, on a number of early socio-cultural research projects concerning healing, ritual, and communitas, she continued to develop these topics following his death in 1983, especially the concept of communitas. Edith Turner contributed to the study of humanistic anthropology and was a dedicated social activist her entire life.

== Early life ==
Edith Lucy Brocklesby Davis was born in Ely, England, on June 17, 1921, to Lucy Gertrude Davis (formerly Howard) and Reverend Dr. George Brocklesby Davis. She attended the Perse School for Girls, Cambridge, from 1933 to 1936 for her secondary education. She earned her bachelor's degree in 1938 from Alde House Domestic Science College.

Davis met her husband Victor Turner during World War II, while working as a "land girl" (agricultural labourer) in the Women's Land Army. He was serving as a noncombatant. They were married on January 30, 1943. They had five children together, including: scientist Robert Turner, poet Frederick Turner, author Irene Turner Wellman, and Rory Turner, an anthropology professor at Goucher College.

== Move to the United States ==
In the early 1960s she and her family moved to the United States, where her husband held academic positions at Cornell University, the University of Chicago, and the University of Virginia.

As Edith Turner, she completed her master's degree in literature 1980 through the University of Virginia. Her master's degree thesis was entitled "The Mysterious Duke: Shakespeare in the Light of Liminality".

She also studied at University of Cape Town, Princeton University, and Smith College.

== Academic life ==
In 1984, Edith Turner was appointed as a lecturer in anthropology at the University of Virginia. To this day, she has some of the most widely spanning ethnographic fieldwork across the globe.

Her work includes "the Ndembu of Zambia (1951–1954), the Bagisu of Uganda (1966), pilgrimage sites in Mexico (1969, 1970), and pilgrimages in Ireland (1971, 1972). She also studied shrines in India and Sri Lanka (1979), Brazilian carnival and Afro-Brazilian cults (1979), Israeli rituals (1980), Japanese ritual and theater (1981), Yaqui ritual (1981, 1986), Israel pilgrimages (1983), African American healing churches (1985), Civil War reenactments (1986–87), Korean shamanism (1987), Inupiat festivals (1987–1988, 1989, 1990, 1991, 1992, 1993), suburban American rituals, ritual of the Saami of Kola Peninsula in Russia (1993), commemorations of the 150th anniversary of the Great Famine of Ireland (1995), and Christian groups in the United States (1996)".

== Legacy ==
Edith Turner died on June 18, 2016. She has an award named after her at the University of Virginia. The Edie Turner Humanistic Anthropology Award acknowledges students at the University of Virginia whose teaching, activism, and writing recognize the richness of human experience.

== Selected works ==
- with Victor W. Turner (co-author), Image and Pilgrimage in Christian Culture (1978), Columbia University Press 1995 paperback: ISBN 0-231-04287-6
- Turner, Edith L. B. 1955. “The Money Economy Among the Mwinilunga Ndembu”. Rhodes-Livingston Journal 18:19–37.
- Turner, Edith L. B. 1987. The Spirit and the Drum: A Memoir of Africa. Tucson: University of Arizona Press.
- Turner, Edith L. B. 1990. “The Whale Decides: Eskimos’ and Ethnographer's Shared Consciousness on the Ice”. Etudes/Inuit/Studies ´ 14 (1–2): 39–54.
- Turner, Edith L. B., William Blodgett, Singelton Kahona, and Fideli Benwa. 1992. Experiencing Ritual: A New Interpretation of African Healing. Philadelphia: University of Pennsylvania Press.
- Turner, Edith L. B. 1992. “Poetics and Experience in Anthropological Writing”. In Anthropology and Literature, edited by Paul Benson, 27–47. Urbana: University of Illinois Press.
- Turner, Edith L. B. 1993. “The Reality of Spirits: A Tabooed or Permitted Field of Study”. Anthropology of Consciousness 4 (1): 9–12.
- Turner, Edith L. B. 1996. The Hands Feel It: Healing and Spirit Presence among a Northern Alaskan People. DeKalb: Northern Illinois University Press.
- Turner, Edith L. B. 1997. “There Are No Peripheries to Humanity: Northern Alaska Nuclear Dumping and the Inupiat’s Search for ˜ Redress”. Anthropology and Humanism 22 (1): 95–109.
- Turner, Edith L. B. 2000. “Theology and the Anthropological Study of Spirit Events in an Inupiat’s Village”. In Anthropology and Theology: Gods, Icons and God-Talk, edited by Walter Randolph Adams and Frank A. Salamone, 137–61. Lanham, MD: University Press of America.
- Turner, Edith L. B. 2003. “Fear of Religious Emotion Versus the Need for Research that Encompasses the Fullest Experience”. In Selected Readings in the Anthropology of Religion: Theoretical and Methodological Essays, edited by Stephen D. Glazier and Charles A. Flowerday, 109–18. Westport, CT: Praeger.
- Turner, Edith L. B. 2005. Among the Healers: Stories of Spiritual and Ritual Healing Around the World. New York: Praeger.
- Turner, Edith L. B. 2006. The Heart of Lightness: The Life of an Anthropologist. New York: Berghahn.
- Turner, Edith L. B. 2011. “Our Lady of Knock: Reflections of a Believing Anthropologist”. New Hibernia Review 15 (2): 121–25.
- Turner, Edith L. B. 2012. Communitas: The Anthropology of Collective Joy. New York: Palgrave Macmillan.
