= Arno Villringer =

German neurologist (born 1958)

- Born: 1958 (age 67–68); Germany
- Awards: Pater Leander Fischer Award, German Society of Laser Medicine (2005), endowed professorship (by Deutsche Forschungs Gemeinschaft) at Charité – Humboldt University of Berlin (1996), Gerhard Hess Award, DFG (1993), DFG foreign exchange scholarship (1985)
- Scientific career
- Fields: Medicine, neurology, stroke research, brain plasticity, heart-brain interactions
- Workplaces: Max Planck Institute for Human Cognitive and Brain Sciences (professor, director), Leipzig University (Professor), Charité - Humboldt University of Berlin (Honorary professor)

Arno Villringer (born 1958 in Schopfheim) is a German neuroscientist, physician and university professor. He serves as Director of the Department of Neurology at the Max Planck Institute for Human Cognitive and Brain Sciences in Leipzig, Germany; Director of the Clinic for Cognitive Neurology at University of Leipzig Medical Center; and founder as well as spokesperson and Academic Director of the Berlin School of Mind and Brain. He holds a full professorship at University of Leipzig and an honorary professorship at Charité, Humboldt University of Berlin. Between July 2022 and June 2025, he was Chairperson of the Human Sciences Section of the Max Planck Society.

== Life and career ==
Villringer studied medicine at University of Freiburg from 1977 to 1984, where he also received a Doctor of Medicine. After a fellowship at the Nuclear Magnetic Resonance Unit at Massachusetts General Hospital at Harvard Medical School in 1985, he was a neurology resident at LMU Munich, became a board-certified neurologist in 1992, and gained his habilitation in 1994.

From 1993 to 2007, he worked at the Department of Neurology at the Charité in Berlin, first as a consultant, and later as a professor and head of the Department of Neurology at the Benjamin Franklin Campus. Since 2007, he has been a Director of the Department of Neurology at Max Planck Institute for Human Cognitive and Brain Sciences in Leipzig, Germany, and director of the Clinic for Cognitive Neurology at University of Leipzig Medical Center.

In 2006, he founded Berlin School of Mind and Brain and has served as its academic director since then. He serves as director of the Mind&Brain Institute since 2010. He is also the coordinator of the BMBF-funded national German Competence Network Stroke, and was formerly the coordinator of the Berlin Neuroimaging Center. He has served as a principal investigator of two Clusters of Excellence (Neurocure at Charité from 2010 to 2018, LeiCeM at Leipzig University since 2026). Since 2018, he has been the founder and spokesperson of the Max Planck School of Cognition, a German-wide initiative of universities and research organizations.

== Work and research ==
=== Research ===
Villringer's research addresses brain-body interactions as well as the neural and behavioral processes underlying the development of risk factors for neurological disorders, particularly stroke and dementia.

Further areas of research include interactions between mind, brain, and body, neuroplasticity, and conscious and unconscious processing in the somatosensory system. His work uses a range of methods, including behavioral and neurocognitive testing, neuroimaging techniques (e.g., MRI, EEG, MEG, fNIRS, EEG/fMRI), neurostimulation approaches (tDCS, TMS, tACS, focused ultrasound), as well as brain-computer interfaces and virtual reality.

Villringer is the author of more than 600 academic articles (as of 2026) with more than 79,000 citations, and a h-index of 135 (Google Scholar, April 2026).

=== Work ===
==== Perfusion imaging ====
Villringer pioneered magnetic resonance perfusion imaging of the brain by demonstrating that susceptibility contrast agents such as GdDTPA may be employed in magnetic resonance imaging (MRI). The susceptibility-based contrast mechanism later became relevant for the Blood Oxygenation Level Dependent (BOLD) signal in functional magnetic resonance imaging (fMRI).

==== Optical imaging ====
In 1993, Villringer showed the feasibility of noninvasive functional near-infrared spectroscopy and imaging (fNIRS, fNIRI) of the human brain followed by over 50 publications establishing and validating fNIRS.

Since 1992, his research focus has been on neurophysiological mechanisms underlying brain function and plasticity, using multi-modal brain imaging, e.g., signatures of neuronal inhibition in functional brain imaging, combined fNIRS/fMRI to establish relationship between BOLD and deoxy-Hb concentration in fMRI, combined EEG/fMRI to show fMRI correlates of background rhythms and simultaneously assess neuronal spiking and fMRI.

==== Brain plasticity, development of vascular risk factors, heart-brain interactions, stroke ====
Villringer has proposed the hypothesis that (maladaptive) brain plasticity is crucial for the development of vascular risk factors leading to stroke and for the (lack of) recovery after stroke, and that brain plasticity can be beneficially modified. He examines brain–body interactions as a link between cardiovascular and mental health and their role in shaping somatosensory perception. For this purpose, he employs multi-modal brain imaging to understand basic neurophysiological mechanisms underlying human brain plasticity in cortical and subcortical brain areas, and their interaction. Behavioral correlates include sensorimotor function, reaction to stress, and emotions. The clinical applications are (i) prevention of vascular risk factors (obesity, hypertension) and subsequent stroke, and (ii) recovery after stroke.

=== Expert activities and board memberships ===
Villringer has held various scientific and academic positions since the late 1990s. Since 1999, he has been serving as the coordinator of the German Competence Network Stroke in Berlin. Since 2005, he has been a member of the faculty of the International Max Planck Research School on the Life Course in Berlin. He has been a member of the Board of Directors of the Leipzig Research Center for Civilization Diseases (LIFE) since 2008 and initiated the Dialogforum Depression in Berlin in 2011. In addition, since 2011, he has been the deputy director and a principal investigator in the MPS-UCL Research Initiative on Computational Psychiatry and Aging Research in Berlin. Since 2018, he has been a faculty member of the International Max Planck Research School IMPRS Comp2Psych and spokesperson of the Max Planck School of Cognition, a Germany-wide network involving multiple universities and Max Planck Institutes. Since 2026, he has been a principal investigator in the Excellence Cluster Leipzig Center of Metabolism (LeiCeM) at the University of Leipzig, scheduled to run until 2033.

Between 2010 and 2016, Villringer was a member of the Steering Committee of the Integrated Research and Treatment Center (IFB) AdiposityDiseases. From 2010 to 2018, he was a member of the Max Planck International Research Network on Aging (MaxNetAging) in Rostock. Between 2012 and 2019, he served as a principal investigator in the NeuroCure Cluster of Excellence in Berlin. From 2013 to 2021, he was a member of the Steering Committee of the Collaborative Research Center 1052 "Obesity Mechanisms" funded by the German Research Foundation (DFG) in Leipzig. Between 2013 and 2020, he served as spokesperson of the International Max Planck Research School IMPRS NeuroCom in Leipzig and was a faculty member of the Research Training Group 2386 "Extrospection: External Access to Higher Cognitive Processes" from 2018 to 2024. He was also a board member of the International Max Planck Research School IMPRS NeuroCom from 2020 to 2023 and served as Deputy Chairperson of the Human Sciences Section of the Max Planck Society from 2021 to 2022 and serves again since 2025. Between 2022 and 2025, he was an ex officio member of the Senate of the Max Planck Society and Chairperson of its Human Sciences Section, which comprises 22 Max Planck Institutes.

== Memberships in scientific organizations ==
Villringer is a member of several scientific societies, including the Deutsche Gesellschaft für Neurologie (Germany Neurological Society), the Society for Neuroscience (SfN), the International Society for Magnetic Resonance in Medicine (ISMRM), and the International Society of Intracranial Hemodynamics. He is also a founding member of the German Neuroscience Society (founded in 1992), the German Stroke Society (founded in 2001), and the Organization for Human Brain Mapping (OHBM).

== Awards and honors ==
- 1986: DFG foreign exchange scholarship
- 1993: Gerhard Hess Award by the German Research Foundation
- 2006: Pater Leander Fischer Award by the German Society of Laser Medicine (2005)
- 2024: Fellow of the Organization of Human Brain Mapping
