= Thought recording and reproduction device =

Fictional device concept

A thought recording and reproduction device refers to any machine which is able to both directly record and reproduce, via a brain-computer interface, the thoughts, emotions, dreams or other neural/cognitive events of a subject for that or other subjects to experience. While currently residing within mostly fictional displays of the capacity of such devices, the idea has received increased scientific currency since the development of the first BCI-enabled devices.

The term oneirography, referring to the recording of dreams, is also a synonym for the above.

== Fiction ==
This hypothetical technology is a key element in some of the early short stories of William Gibson, including his 1977 debut Fragments of a Hologram Rose, where it is called ASP (Apparent Sensory Perception). In his Sprawl trilogy, it is termed Simstim (Simulation Stimulation), and described as the most popular form of entertainment, perhaps equivalent to 20th century pop music. Whereas most instances depict a heavily edited documentary version, replaying an approximation of the actual experience of the person recorded, in The Winter Market a version able to record dreams and imaginations exists.

A number of films from the 1980s onwards, such as Brainstorm (1983), Until the End of the World (1991), Strange Days (1995), Final Fantasy: The Spirits Within (2001), and Sleep Dealer (2008), depict the technology and its ramifications.

== Research ==
In December 2008, Advanced Telecommunications Research Institute International's Department of Cognitive Neuroscience announced its own research into the translation of neural signals into images. In addition, Prof. Moran Cerf of Caletch published a paper in Nature where he described work that allowed for the real-time interpretation of thoughts. The research outcome has often been popularized as a device that could record dreams. Prof. Moran Cerf discussed the specifics of the work and the theoretical possibilities in various public talks.

=== Current limitations ===
BCI devices can currently translate a limited subset of neural signals into digital signals, most of which are utilized for motor-centric controls of attached devices. The translation of images perceived or conceived within the brain has not yet been fully achieved.

== See also ==
- Mind uploading
- Neuralink
- Oneironautics
- TED-talk, February 2016: Moran Cerf: This scientist can hack your dreams
- Thought identification
