= Freedom of thought =

Freedom to hold a thought

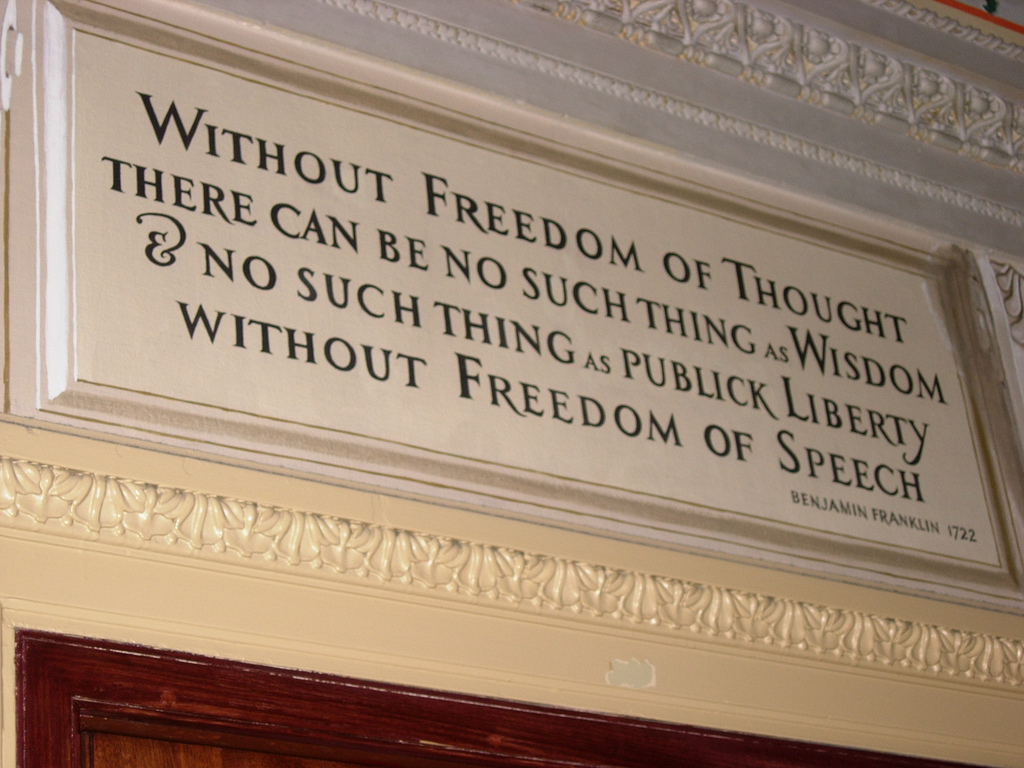
"Without freedom of thought there can be no such thing as wisdom & no such thing as public liberty without freedom of speech", Benjamin Franklin, 1722

Freedom of thought is the freedom of an individual to hold or consider a fact, viewpoint, or thought, independent of others' viewpoints.

== Overview ==
Every person attempts to have a cognitive proficiency by developing knowledge, concepts, and theories and assessing them in the given environment. This cognitive proficiency gives a sense of contentment and replaces the feeling of helplessness. Apart from bringing ease to the ego of a person, new knowledge and ideas also bring a hope for the future.

Freedom of thought is the precursor and progenitor of—and thus is closely linked to—other liberties, including freedom of religion, freedom of speech, and freedom of expression. Though freedom of thought is axiomatic for many other freedoms, they are in no way required for it to operate and exist. The conception of a freedom or a right does not guarantee its inclusion, legality, or protection via a philosophical caveat. It is a very important concept in the Western world and nearly all democratic constitutions protect these freedoms.

For instance, the United States Bill of Rights contains the famous guarantee in the First Amendment that laws may not be made that interfere with religion "or prohibiting the free exercise thereof". U.S. Supreme Court Justice Benjamin Cardozo reasoned in Palko v. Connecticut (1937):

Freedom of thought... is the matrix, the indispensable condition, of nearly every other form of freedom. With rare aberrations a pervasive recognition of this truth can be traced in our history, political and legal.

Such ideas are also a vital part of international human rights law. In the Universal Declaration of Human Rights (UDHR), which is legally binding on member states of the International Covenant on Civil and Political Rights (ICCPR), "freedom of thought" is listed under Article 18:

Everyone has the right to freedom of thought, conscience and religion; this right includes freedom to change his religion or belief, and freedom, either alone or in community with others and in public or private, to manifest his religion or belief in teaching, practice, worship and observance.

The United Nations' Human Rights Committee states that this "distinguishes the freedom of thought, conscience, religion or belief from the freedom to manifest religion or belief. It does not permit any limitations whatsoever on the freedom of thought and conscience or on the freedom to have or adopt a religion or belief of one's choice. These freedoms are protected unconditionally". Similarly, Article 19 of the UDHR guarantees that "Everyone has the right to freedom of opinion and expression; this right includes freedom to hold opinions without interference".

Article 9 of the European Convention on Human Rights states, "Everyone has the right to freedom of thought, conscience and religion."

== History of development and suppression ==
It is impossible to know with certainty what another person is thinking, making suppression difficult. The concept is developed throughout the Bible, most fully in the writings of Saul of Tarsus (e.g., "For why should my freedom [eleutheria] be judged by another's conscience [suneideseos]?" 1 Corinthians 10:29).

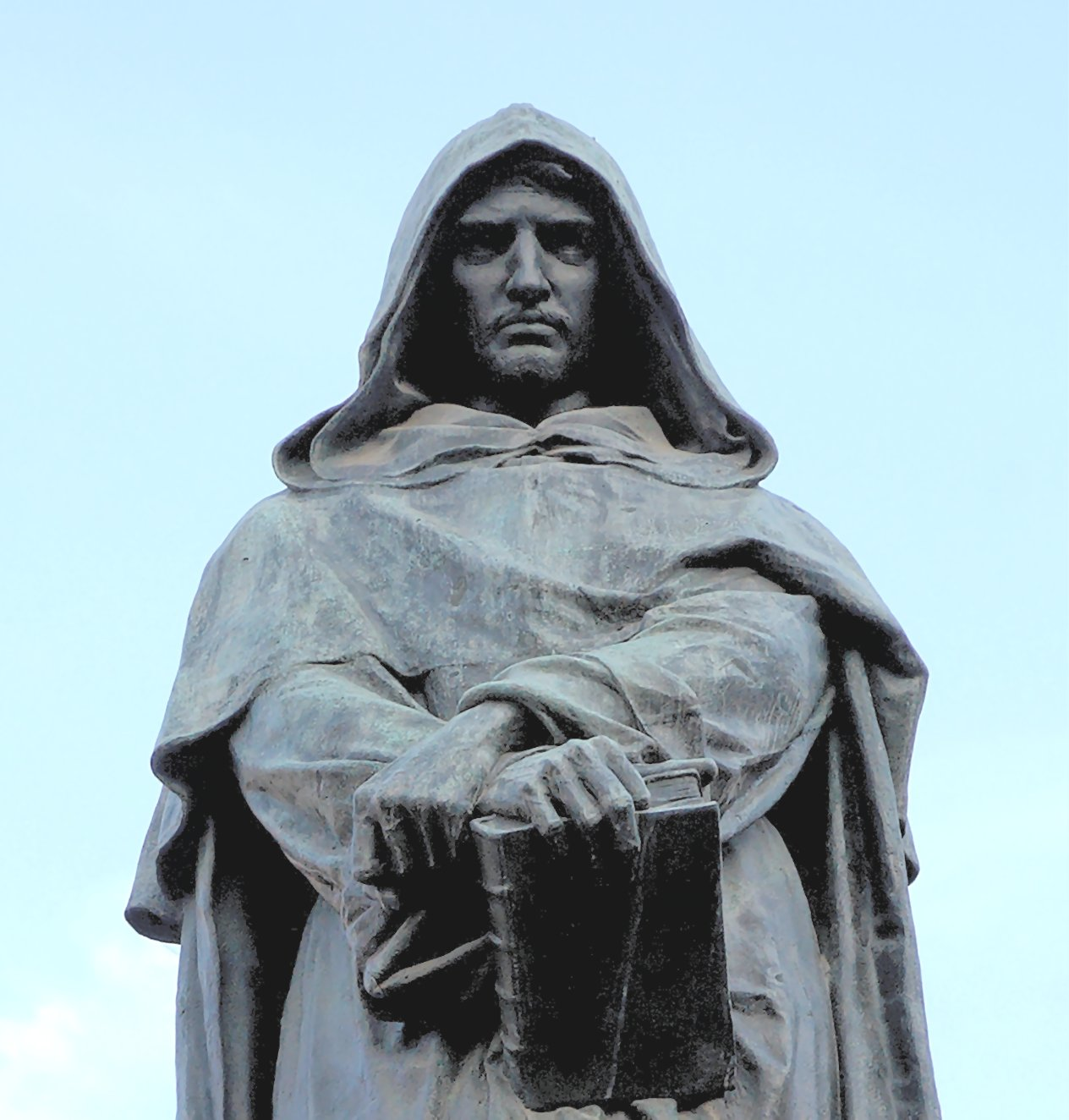
Bronze statue of Giordano Bruno in Rome

Although Greek philosophers Plato and Socrates had discussed freedom of thought minimally, the edicts of King Ashoka (3rd century BC) have been called the first decree respecting freedom of conscience. In European tradition, aside from the decree of religious toleration by Constantine I at Milan in 313, the philosophers Themistius, Michel de Montaigne, Baruch Spinoza, John Locke, Voltaire, Alexandre Vinet, and John Stuart Mill and the theologians Roger Williams and Samuel Rutherford have been considered major proponents of the idea of freedom of conscience (or "soul liberty" in the words of Williams).

Queen Elizabeth I revoked a thought censorship law in the late sixteenth century, because, according to Sir Francis Bacon, she did "not [like] to make windows into men's souls and secret thoughts". During her reign, however, a number of books published by theorist Giordano Bruno spurred controversy, mentioning topics banned by the Catholic Church such as the possibility of an infinite universe. Unwilling to recant these ideas, Bruno was eventually burned as a heretic in Rome by the Italian Inquisition, in turn becoming a martyr for free thought.

Oliver Cromwell is described by Ignaz von Döllinger as "the first among the mighty men of the world to set up one special religious principle, and to enforce it so far as in him lay: ... The principle of liberty of conscience and the repudiation of religious coercion".

However, freedom of expression can be limited through censorship, arrests, book burning, or propaganda, and this tends to discourage freedom of thought. Examples of effective campaigns against freedom of expression are the Soviet suppression of genetics research in favor of a theory known as Lysenkoism, the book-burning campaigns of Nazi Germany, the radical anti-intellectualism enforced in Cambodia under Pol Pot and in Nazi Germany under Adolf Hitler, the strict limits on freedom of expression imposed by the Communist governments of the People's Republic of China and Cuba or by Capitalist dictatorships such as those of Augusto Pinochet in Chile and Francisco Franco in Spain.

The Sapir–Whorf hypothesis, which states that thought can be embedded in language, would support the claim that an effort to limit the use of words of language is actually a form of restricting freedom of thought. This was explored in George Orwell's novel 1984, with the idea of Newspeak, a stripped-down form of the English language alleged to lack the capacity for metaphor and limiting expression of original ideas.

More recently, neuroimaging technology has raised concerns about entities possibly reading and subsequently suppressing thought. These concerns form the emerging fields of neuroethics and neuroprivacy.

Humanists International publishes the annual Freedom of Thought Report, which compiles country-by-country material on the treatment of non-religious people and related freedoms of expression and belief.

== See also ==
- Attention theft
- Cognitive liberty
- Doublethink
- Freedom of conscience
- Freedom of religion
- Freethought
- Four Freedoms, Franklin Roosevelt's speech
- Free speech zone
- Free will
- Intellectual freedom
- Mind control
- Prisoner of conscience
- Public opinion
- Sakharov Prize
- Thoughtcrime
