= Stefan Koelsch =

Music cognition researcher

Stefan Koelsch (* 7 July 1968 in Wichita Falls) is a German–American–Norwegian psychologist, neuroscientist, violinist, and bestselling author.

== Biography ==
Stefan Koelsch studied instrumental and vocal music at the University of Arts Bremen, and then psychology as well as sociology at Leipzig University. He graduated in 1994 with an artistic degree, 1998 with a diploma in psychology, and 2000 with a diploma in sociology. With his thesis Brain and Music: A contribution to the investigation of central auditory processing with a new electrophysiological approach, which was compiled at the Max Planck Institute for Human Cognitive and Brain Sciences, he was awarded with a PhD (doctor rerum naturalium) at Leipzig University. After a postdoctoral fellowship at Harvard Medical School (U.S.), he founded the independent junior research group Neurocognition of Music at the Max Planck Institute for Human Cognitive and Brain Sciences in Leipzig in 2003. In 2004, Stefan Koelsch was awarded the habilitation in psychology at Leipzig University.

In 2006, Stefan Koelsch was appointed as Senior Lecturer at the University of Sussex, where he taught and conducted research in the fields of cognitive and affective neuroscience, biological psychology and music psychology. In 2010, he was appointed as university professor of music psychology and neuroscience at the Cluster of Excellence Languages of Emotion at the Free University of Berlin. Since 2015, he has been Professor of Biological Psychology, Medical Psychology, and Music Psychology at the University of Bergen (Norway), to which he was appointed as part of the Norwegian Top Research Program (Toppforskprogrammet).

== Research ==
Stefan Koelsch's main fields of research include perception, attention, working memory, emotion, music therapy, and personality. Based on his research he concludes that the neural resources of music- and language-processing overlap strongly, and that activity in any brain structure that plays a causal role for emotions can be influenced by music. The latter has important implications for the therapeutic use of music, because numerous chronic somatic, psychiatric and neurological disorders and diseases are associated with functional abnormalities of these brain structures.
