= Kamil Ugurbil =

Kamil Uğurbil
- Born: 1949 (age 76–77); Tire, İzmir, Turkey
- Education: Columbia University (B.A. 1971, M.A. 1974, Ph.D. 1977)
- Scientific career
- Fields: Physics, Neuroscience, Biomedical engineering, Magnetic resonance imaging
- Workplaces: University of Minnesota

Kamil Ugurbil (born July 11, 1949, Tire, İzmir, Turkey) is a Turkish-American physicist, biomedical imaging scientist, and neuroscientist known for his contributions to magnetic resonance imaging (MRI), functional magnetic resonance imaging (fMRI), and ultra-high-field imaging, particularly for human brain studies. He is a Regents Professor and McKnight Presidential Endowed Chair Professor in the Departments of Radiology, Neuroscience, and Medicine at the University of Minnesota, where he is also the founding director of the Center for Magnetic Resonance Research (CMRR). According to Google Scholar, his scientific publications have received more than 113,000 citations, and he has an h-index of 157.

== Early life and education ==
Kamil Ugurbil was born in Tire, İzmir Province, Turkey. He completed his primary education in Tire before attending İzmir Maarif College, now known as Bornova Anatolian High school, for middle school. He later transferred to Robert College in Istanbul for his high-school education, graduating in 1967. Ugurbil subsequently moved to the United States to pursue higher education. He received a B.A. in physics from Columbia College, Columbia University in New York in 1971, followed by an M.A. in physics in 1974 and a Ph.D. in Chemical Physics in 1977, also from Columbia University.

== Career ==
After completing his doctoral studies, Ugurbil began his research career at AT&T Bell Laboratories, where he worked from 1977 to 1979. He then joined the Department of Biochemistry at Columbia University, serving on its faculty as an assistant professor from 1979 to 1982. In 1982, Ugurbil was recruited to the University of Minnesota, where he was appointed an associate professor in the Department of Biochemistry. He subsequently held professorships in radiology, neuroscience, and medicine at the university. In 1991, Ugurbil became the founding director of the university's Center for Magnetic Resonance Research (CMRR), a position through which he led research into magnetic resonance imaging and its applications in neuroscience and medicine. He served as one of the two principle investigators (PIs) of NIH’s Human Connectome Project (HCP) and was one of the fourteen member Working Group tasked with developing the strategic plan for the US BRAIN Initiative.

== Research ==
=== Functional MRI ===
Functional magnetic resonance imaging (fMRI) emerged independently from research conducted by two groups in 1991–1992, one of which was Ugurbil's at the Center for Magnetic Resonance Research (CMRR) and the other a group headed by Kenneth Kwong at Massachusetts General Hospital and Harvard University. Building on Seiji Ogawa's discovery of the blood-oxygen-level-dependent (BOLD) contrast-mechanism, Ugurbil and his team, in collaboration with Ogawa, demonstrated that BOLD-sensitive MRI could be used to detect and map functional activity in the living human brain. Their findings were reported in a 1992 paper by Ogawa, Tank, Menon, Ellermann, Kim, Merkle, and Ugurbil, published in the Proceedings of the National Academy of Sciences.

=== Ultra-high-field MRI ===
A major focus of Ugurbil’s research has been the development of ultra-high-field MRI systems operating at magnetic field strengths of 7 Tesla and above in order to push functional brain imaging to new levels of sensitivity and spatial resolution. His group developed the first 7 Tesla MRI system and helped establish 7 Tesla MRI for human research and medical diagnosis. He and his team subsequently established even higher-field systems, including a 10.5 Tesla whole-body human MRI scanner. These systems provide significantly improved signal-to-noise ratio, spatiotemporal resolution, and accuracy of functional maps of brain activity compared with conventional clinical MRI scanners, enabling visualization of fine anatomical structures and mesoscale functional organizations in the brain.

=== In vivo magnetic resonance spectroscopy ===
Ugurbil's research in magnetic resonance spectroscopy (MRS) began during his work at Bell Laboratories and continued at Columbia University and the University of Minnesota. His studies explored MRS as a noninvasive approach for investigating intracellular biochemistry in living systems, with early work involving bacteria and perfused organs and later extending to the human brain. Using 7-tesla MRS, Ugurbil and his collaborators studied cerebral energy metabolism in vivo, including the measurement of ATP synthesis rates in the living human brain.

== Awards and honors ==
- 2022: Mansfield Lecture, ISMRM
- 2021: ISMAR Prize
- 2019: IEEE Medal for Innovations in Healthcare Technology
- 2018: Haughton Award, American Society of Functional Neuroradiology
- 2016: Vehbi Koç Award
- 2014: Richard R. Ernst Gold Medal and Lecture, ETH Zurich
- 2014: Election to the National Academy of Inventors
- 2011: Honorary Doctorate, Maastricht University
- 2007: Election to the National Academy of Medicine
- 2005: Election to the American Academy of Arts and Sciences
- 2005: Honorary Doctorate, Utrecht University
- 2004: Segerfalk Lecture Award
- 1996: Gold Medal, ISMRM
