= Amplitude of low frequency fluctuations =

Metrics in magnetic resonance imaging

Amplitude of low-frequency fluctuations (ALFF) and fractional ALFF (fALFF) are resting-state functional MRI (rs-fMRI) metrics that quantify the power of spontaneous, low-frequency (~0.01–0.10 Hz) fluctuations of the BOLD signal within a voxel or region of interest. ALFF measures the square root of the power spectrum within a predefined low-frequency band (commonly 0.01–0.08 or 0.01–0.10 Hz). The exact upper cutoff depends on the sampling rate (repetition time, TR) and must be below the Nyquist frequency (1/(2·TR)). fALFF is the ratio of power within that low-frequency band to the total power across a broader band (often 0–0.25 Hz), which reduces nonspecific physiological noise relative to ALFF.

Electrophysiological studies suggest that low-frequency BOLD oscillations partly reflect spontaneous neuronal activity: simultaneous EEG–fMRI demonstrates that canonical resting-state networks exhibit distinct electrophysiological signatures whose power covaries with BOLD fluctuations. Early rs-fMRI work also showed that frequencies below ~0.1 Hz dominate functional connectivity patterns.

== History ==
The ALFF metric was popularized in early rs-fMRI studies in the mid‑2000s and applied to clinical populations. A widely cited report applied ALFF to children with attention-deficit/hyperactivity disorder (ADHD), describing regional increases and decreases relative to typically developing peers. The fALFF variant was introduced to improve specificity to gray-matter neuronal fluctuations by normalizing low-frequency power to the whole-band power.

== Computation ==
ALFF and fALFF are typically computed as follows: (1) preprocess rs-fMRI time series (slice timing correction, realignment, nuisance regression, spatial normalization, and—optionally—temporal filtering); (2) transform each voxel's time series to the frequency domain with a FFT and obtain the power spectrum; (3) define a low-frequency band (commonly 0.01–0.08 or 0.01–0.10 Hz, constrained by the Nyquist frequency 1/(2·TR)) and compute ALFF as the square root of the average power within that band; and (4) compute fALFF as the ratio of power in the low-frequency band to the power across a broader band (e.g., up to the Nyquist frequency set by TR; often 0–0.25 Hz for TR≈2 s).

=== Frequency choices and sub-bands ===
Some studies partition the spectrum into sub‑bands—commonly slow‑5 (0.01–0.027 Hz) and slow‑4 (0.027–0.073 Hz)—to probe frequency‑specific effects; frequency‑dependent differences in ALFF/fALFF topography are robust across datasets.

== Physiological considerations ==
Low-frequency BOLD power is influenced by neuronal and non‑neuronal factors. Non‑neuronal contributors include cardiac and respiratory cycles and cerebrospinal fluid pulsations, which can contaminate signals near large vessels and ventricles. fALFF reduces some of this sensitivity by normalizing low‑frequency power to total power, though it does not fully remove physiological noise.

== Topography and the default mode network ==
Whole‑brain ALFF/fALFF maps show relatively high values in regions associated with the default mode network (DMN), including the posterior cingulate cortex, precuneus, medial prefrontal cortex, and bilateral inferior parietal lobule, consistent with the prominence of low‑frequency activity in these areas.

== Clinical and research applications ==
ALFF and fALFF are descriptive markers used in case–control comparisons and biomarker discovery across many conditions. Examples include:

- Attention‑deficit/hyperactivity disorder: altered ALFF in frontal, sensorimotor, brainstem, and cerebellar regions in children with ADHD.
- Schizophrenia: voxelwise analyses report regional increases and decreases in ALFF/fALFF; findings vary across cohorts. Reviews and multi‑site analyses highlight heterogeneity and the importance of harmonized preprocessing.
- Major depressive disorder: quantitative syntheses indicate abnormal intrinsic activity, with meta‑analyses reporting altered ALFF in cingulo‑prefrontal and posterior midline regions; effect directions vary with clinical features and methods.
- Alzheimer's disease and mild cognitive impairment: meta‑analyses report alterations involving the posterior cingulate/precuneus and parahippocampal regions; frequency‑specific effects have been described in aMCI and AD.

== Relation to ReHo and PerAF ==
=== Regional homogeneity (ReHo) ===
ReHo measures the similarity (Kendall's coefficient of concordance) of a voxel's time series with its neighbors, indexing local synchrony rather than amplitude. It is often complementary to ALFF/fALFF in mapping local coherence versus power.

=== Percent amplitude of fluctuation (PerAF) ===
PerAF expresses the average absolute BOLD fluctuation at each voxel as a percentage of its mean signal across time. Unlike ALFF/fALFF, which are band‑limited spectral measures, PerAF is a time‑domain, scale‑independent metric analogous to percent signal change in task fMRI.

== Limitations ==
ALFF/fALFF are sensitive to preprocessing choices (e.g., filtering, motion regression), physiological noise, and scanner/sequence parameters. Interpretability at the single‑subject level is limited; these metrics are most reliable for group‑level comparisons.

== See also ==
- Resting-state functional connectivity
- Default mode network
