= Robert Turner (neuroscientist) =

British neuroscientist

- Born: 1946 (age 79–80); Northamptonshire, England
- Education: University College London; Simon Fraser University; Cornell University
- Awards: Simon Fraser University Outstanding Achievement Award 2009, Thorsten Almen Prize 1995 (LMU Munich), Wellcome Principal Research Fellow and Professor, International Society for Magnetic Resonance in Medicine Fellow
- Scientific career
- Fields: Imaging neuroscience, Physics, MRI technology, Social Anthropology, Neuroanthropology
- Workplaces: Max Planck Institute
- Thesis: The Velocity of Sound in Liquid Copper-Tin Alloys (1972)
- Doctoral advisor: John F. Cochran

Robert Turner is a British neuroscientist, physicist, and social anthropologist. He has been a director and professor at the Max Planck Institute for Human Cognitive and Brain Sciences in Leipzig, Germany, and is an internationally recognized expert in brain physics and magnetic resonance imaging (MRI). Coils inside every MRI scanner owe their shape to his ideas.

== Background ==
Robert Turner is the son of British cultural anthropologist Victor Turner and Edith Turner, and brother of poet Frederick Turner. He was born in Northamptonshire, England. He lived for several years in Zambia before returning to England, completing his secondary education at Manchester Grammar School.

He studied mathematics and physics at Cornell University 1964–1968, graduating with a BA magna cum laude. He then went on to study physics at Simon Fraser University and was awarded a PhD in 1973. For his PhD thesis, he invented and used a novel technique to measure the velocity of sound in molten metal alloys. He also completed a Post-graduate Diploma in Social Anthropology at University College London between 1975 and 1977, and conducted field ethnographic research resulting in several academic publications.

Between 2006 and his retirement in 2014, Turner was the director of the Department of Neurophysics, which he established at the Max Planck Institute for Human Cognitive and Brain Sciences, Leipzig, Germany.

== Academic achievements ==
Robert Turner is among a group of pioneering physicists who helped create magnetic resonance imaging (MRI) and functional Magnetic Resonance Imaging (fMRI), which today is the most widely used method of brain mapping. In the 1980s, he worked with distinguished scientists including 2003 Nobel Prize winner Sir Peter Mansfield to produce a mathematical framework for MRI coil design which was crucial to the development of ultra-fast echoplanar imaging (EPI). This technique allows the recording of changes in blood flow in the brain associated with brain function and was crucial to the development of fMRI.

From 1988 until 1993 he worked as a researcher at the National Institutes of Health in Bethesda, MD. Working with Denis le Bihan, a French neuroradiologist, he initially showed that EPI could be used to provide high quality maps of water diffusion in brain tissue, a discovery (known as Diffusion MRI) which has led to the widespread clinical use of MRI in stroke, where water diffusion in the affected brain tissue drops very rapidly after the ischemic event. The technique also lies at the heart of diffusion tensor imaging, a method for non-invasive study of connecting pathways within the brain's white matter.

In 1991, still at NIH, he was the first to show that EPI could be used to monitor the time course of oxygenation changes in animal brain resulting from changes in the breathing gas. This led to the discovery, made in collaboration with noted researcher Kenneth Kwong that EPI could accurately track within seconds the local changes in blood oxygenation in human brain (BOLD) caused by task-related neural activity. For the first time, human brain activity could thus be observed entirely non-invasively, using the natural contrast agent of deoxyhaemoglobin. In 1992, papers by Kwong et al. and Seiji Ogawa et al. appeared, showing similar results demonstrating that BOLD contrast enables the mapping of activation patterns in the working human brain. These findings led to an explosion of interest in fMRI, which depends almost entirely on the use of EPI to investigate human brain function, and the subsequent development of what has come to be known as Imaging Neuroscience.

In 1993 he returned to the United Kingdom as a Wellcome Principal Research Fellow to become head of MRI at the Wellcome Trust Centre for Neuroimaging at University College London,[17] a position he held from 1993 to 2003. In 1994 he was awarded a professorship by University College London.[18] From 2006 until his retirement in 2014, he was director of the Department of Neurophysics at the Max Planck Institute for Human Cognitive and Brain Sciences, Leipzig. His work there centred on the quest to gain more precise knowledge of the structure and function of the human brain, by using more powerful MRI scanners and improved hardware and methodology.[19] He continues to explore the implications for neuroscience and brain modelling of this improved knowledge, and he also contributes to the development of Neuroanthropology, which brings together insights from the study of culture and the study of the brain.[20]

Author of over 280 refereed articles in the fields of neurophysics, physics, anthropology and music, Turner has a Web of Science h-index of over 70, meaning he has authored a large number of highly cited academic papers. His work has also resulted in several patents in the US and worldwide,[21][22][23][24][25] and UK,[26][27][28][29] for coils used in imaging. and UK, for coils used in imaging.

== Memberships ==
Committees: Scientific Advisory Board, Brown University Magnetic Resonance Imaging Facility, Brown University. Advisory Committee, Centre for Cognition, Computation and Culture, Goldsmiths College, University of London. International Advisory Board, CEA, Orsay, Paris. Scientific Advisory Committee, Institute for Music in Human and Social Development, University of Edinburgh. External Advisory Committee, 7 T Facility, Sir Peter Mansfield Imaging Centre, Nottingham, UK. International Advisory Board, Grenoble Institute for Neuroscience, Grenoble, France. Professional Journals: Magnetic Resonance in Medicine (Associate Editor), Magnetic Resonance Materials in Physics, Biology and Medicine (Editorial Board), Frontiers in Neuroscience (Review Editor) Societies: International Society for Magnetic Resonance in Medicine (Fellow), Leipziger Neuromusik Gesprächskreis (Co-Director)

== Awards ==
- 2020 Gold Medal of the International Society for Magnetic Resonance in Medicine
- 2009 Simon Fraser University Alumni Association Outstanding Achievement Award
- 2005 International Society for Magnetic Resonance in Medicine Fellow
- 1995 Thorsten Almen Prize (LMU Munich)
- 1993–2003 Wellcome Principal Research Fellow and Professor

== Selected works ==
- Stehling, M. K., Turner, R., & Mansfield, P. (1991). Echo-planar imaging: magnetic resonance imaging in a fraction of a second. Science, 254, 43–50.
- Turner, R., Le Bihan, D., Moonen, C.T.W., Despres, D., & Frank J. (1991) Echo-planar time course MRI of cat brain deoxygenation changes. Magnetic Resonance in Medicine, 22, 159–166.
- Kwong, K. K., Belliveau, J. W., Chesler, D. A., Goldberg, I. E., Weisskoff, R. M., Poncelet, B. P., Kennedy, D. N., Hoppel, B. E., Cohen, M. S., Turner, R., Cheng. H-M., Brady, T. J., & Rosen, B. R. (1992). Dynamic magnetic resonance imaging of human brain activity during primary sensory stimulation. Proceedings of the National Academy of Sciences USA, 89(12), 5675–5679.
- Turner, R., Jezzard, P., Wen, H., Kwong, K. K., Le Bihan, D., Zeffiro, .T, & Balaban, R. S., (1993). Functional mapping of the human visual cortex at 4 tesla and 1.5 tesla using deoxygenation contrast EPI. Magnetic Resonance in Medicine, 29, 277–279.
- Friston, K. F., Jezzard, P., & Turner, R., (1994). The analysis of functional MRI time series. Human Brain Mapping,1, 53–171.
- Karni, A., Meyer, G., Jezzard, P., Adams, M. M., Turner, R., & Ungerleider, L. G. (1995). Functional MRI evidence for adult motor plasticity during motor skill learning. Nature, 377, 155–158.
- Neville, H. J., Bavelier, D., Corina, D., Rauschecker, J. P., Karni, A., Lalwani, A., Braun, A., Clark, V., Jezzard, P., & Turner, R. (1998). Cerebral organization for language in deaf and hearing subjects: biological constraints and effects of experience. Proceedings of the National Academy of Sciences USA, 95, 922–929.
- Friston, K. J., Josephs, O., Rees, G., & Turner, R. (1998). Nonlinear event-related responses in fMRI. Magnetic Resonance in Medicine, 39,41–52.
- Allen, P. J., Josephs, O., & Turner, R. (2000). A method for removing imaging artefact from continuous EEG recorded during functional MRI. Neuroimage, 12, 230–9.
- Crinion, J., Turner, R., Grogan, A., Hanakawa, T., Noppeney, U., Devlin, J. T., Aso, T., Urayama, S., Fukuyama, H., Stockton, K., Usui, K., Green, D. W., & Price, C. J. (2006). Language control in the bilingual brain. Science, 312, 1537–40.
- Turner, R., & Whitehead, C. (2008). How collective representations can change the structure of the brain. Journal of Consciousness Studies; 15, 43–57.
- Domínguez Duque, J. F., Turner, R., Lewis, E. D., & Egan, G. (2010). Neuroanthropology: a humanistic science for the study of the culture-brain nexus. Social Cognitive and Affective Neuroscience, 5(2–3),138-47. Epub 4 August 2009.
- Lohmann, G., Margulies, D. S., Horstmann, A., Pleger, B., Lepsien, J., Goldhahn, D., Schloegl, H., Stumvoll, M., Villringer, A., & Turner R. (2010). Eigenvector centrality mapping for analyzing connectivity patterns in FMRI data of the human brain. PLoS One, 5: e10232.
- Jones DK, Knösche TR, Turner R. White matter integrity, fiber count, and other fallacies: the do's and don'ts of diffusion MRI. Neuroimage. 2013 Jun;73:239-54
- Stüber C, Morawski M, Schäfer A, Labadie C, Wähnert M, Leuze C, Streicher M, Barapatre N, Reimann K, Geyer S, Spemann D, Turner R. Myelin and iron concentration in the human brain: a quantitative study of MRI contrast. Neuroimage. 2014 Jun;93 Pt 1:95-106
- Waehnert MD, Dinse J, Weiss M, Streicher MN, Waehnert P, Geyer S, Turner R, Bazin PL. Anatomically motivated modeling of cortical laminae. Neuroimage. 2014 Jun;93 Pt 2:210-20.
- Turner R. Uses, misuses, new uses and fundamental limitations of magnetic resonance imaging in cognitive science. Phil. Trans. R. Soc. 2016 B371:20150349. http://dx.doi.org/10.1098/rstb.2015.0349
- Turner R, De Haan D. Bridging the gap between system and cell: The role of ultra-high field MRI in human neuroscience. Prog Brain Res. 2017;233:179-220
