= Victor Turner =

Scottish cultural anthropologist (1920–1983)

Victor Witter Turner (28 May 1920 – 18 December 1983) was a Scottish cultural anthropologist best known for his work on symbols, rituals, and rites of passage. His work, along with that of Clifford Geertz and others, is often referred to as symbolic and interpretive anthropology.

== Early life and education ==
Victor Witter Turner was born in Glasgow, Scotland, son of Norman and Violet Turner. His father was an electrical engineer and his mother was a repertory actress, who founded the Scottish National Players.

Turner initially studied poetry and classics at University College London.

In 1941, Turner was drafted into World War II and served as a noncombatant until 1944. During his three years of service, he met and married Edith Brocklesby Davis, who was serving during the war as a "land girl".

Turner returned to University College in 1946 with a new focus on anthropology. He later pursued graduate studies in anthropology at Manchester University.

== Career ==
Turner worked in Zambia (then Northern Rhodesia) as research officer for the Rhodes-Livingstone Institute. It was through this position that Turner started his lifelong study of the Ndembu people of Zambia. He completed his PhD at University of Manchester in 1955. Like many of the Manchester anthropologists of his time, he also became concerned with conflict. He developed the new concept of social drama in order to account for the symbolism of conflict and crisis resolution among Ndembu villagers.

Turner spent his career exploring rituals. As a professor at the University of Chicago in the late 1950s, Turner began to apply his study of rituals and rites of passage to world religions and the lives of religious heroes. He and his wife converted to Catholicism in 1958.

Turner explored Arnold van Gennep's threefold structure of rites of passage and expanding theories on the liminal phase. Van Gennep's structure consisted of a pre-liminal phase (separation), a liminal phase (transition), and a post-liminal phase (reincorporation). Turner noted that in liminality, the transitional state between two phases, individuals were "betwixt and between": they did not belong to the society that they previously were a part of and they were not yet reincorporated into that society. Liminality is a limbo, an ambiguous period characterized by humility, seclusion, tests, sexual ambiguity, and communitas.

Turner was also a committed ethnographer and produced work on ritual. He and his wife Edith L. B. Turner co-authored Image and Pilgrimage in Christian Culture (1978). Following his death, she continued to develop concepts they worked on together and to lecture on them.

== Personal life ==
Turner met Edith Turner during his war service. They worked together on anthropological research. Their five children include scientist Robert Turner, poet Frederick Turner, and Rory Turner, an anthropology professor at Goucher College, Maryland.

== Death and legacy ==
Turner died on 18 December 1983 in Charlottesville, Virginia. After his death, his widow Edith embarked on her own career as an anthropologist. She developed upon Victor's "anthropology of experience" with a publication on "communitas".

=== Influence ===
American novelist Chuck Palahniuk was quoted in a 2014 issue of The Believer as saying, "So often what I’m doing is dramatizing the writings of Victor Turner, who wrote a lot about liminal and liminoid events."

Turner's work on liminality and performance has strongly influenced developments in the field of performance studies, particularly due to his friendship and professional collaboration with Richard Schechner with whom he explored the relationship between ritual and theater.

=== Victor Turner Prize ===
The Victor Turner Prize in Ethnographic Writing is awarded annually by the Society for Humanistic Anthropology. Eligible works are "published books in various genres including ethnographic monographs, narratives, essays, biographies, memoirs, poetry, and drama". Kirin Narayan's Storytellers, Saints and Scoundrels: Folk Narrative in Hindu Religious Teaching (1989) was the first Victor Turner Prize winner in 1990.

== Books ==
- The Forest of Symbols: Aspects of Ndembu Ritual (1967), Cornell University Press 1970 paperback: ISBN 0-8014-9101-0
- Schism and Continuity in an African Society (1968), Manchester University Press
- The Drums of Affliction: A Study of Religious Processes among the Ndembu of Zambia (1968), Clarendon Press ISBN 0-8014-9205-X
- The Ritual Process: Structure and Anti-Structure (1969), Aldine Transaction 1995 paperback: ISBN 0-202-01190-9
- Dramas, Fields, and Metaphors: Symbolic Action in Human Society (1974), Cornell University Press 1975 paperback: ISBN 0-8014-9151-7
- Image and Pilgrimage in Christian Culture (1978), with Edith L. B. Turner (co-author), Columbia University Press 1995 paperback: ISBN 0-231-04287-6
- From Ritual to Theatre: The Human Seriousness of Play (1982), PAJ Publications paperback: ISBN 0-933826-17-6
- Liminality, Kabbalah, and the Media (1985), Academic Press
- The Anthropology of Performance (1986), PAJ Publications paperback: ISBN 1-55554-001-5
- The Anthropology of Experience (1986), University of Illinois Press 2001 paperback: ISBN 0-252-01249-6
