= Kenneth Kwong =

American brain imaging researcher

Kwong, Kenneth
- Born: 28 March 1948 (age 78); Hong Kong
- Citizenship: United States
- Education: University of California, Berkeley; University of California, Riverside
- Known for: fMRI
- Scientific career
- Fields: Magnetic Resonance
- Workplaces: Harvard University

Kenneth Kin Man Kwong is a Hong Kong-born American nuclear physicist. He is a pioneer in human brain imaging. He received his bachelor's degree in Political Science in 1972 from the University of California, Berkeley. He went on to receive his Ph.D. in physics from the University of California, Riverside studying photon-photon collision interactions.

== Career ==
In 1985, Kwong was a nuclear medicine physicist at the VA hospital in Loma Linda, California, establishing his work in medical science. After one year he was invited to a research fellowship at the Massachusetts General Hospital (MGH) in the field of PET (positron emission tomography) imaging. Following his work in PET, he began his involvement in magnetic resonance imaging (MRI).

=== MRI, Diffusion, and Perfusion ===
Upon joining the team at the MGH Nuclear Magnetic Resonance (MGH-NMR) Center, Kwong pursued an interest in perfusion (the distribution of blood and nutrients to tissue) and diffusion (the detection of random dispersion of particles, principally water) in living tissues. Together with MIT graduate student Daisy Chien, and colleagues Richard Buxton, Tom Brady and Bruce Rosen he was one of the earliest entrants in the field of brain diffusion imaging, which itself was opened by the pioneering experiments of Denis Le Bihan. In a conference paper in 1988 at the Society for Magnetic Resonance in Medicine the MGH group was the first to demonstrate diffusion anisotropy in the human brain, stating, "... we observed different diffusion patterns parallel and perpendicular to the midline of the brain, which was repeatable, and depended only on the direction of diffusion encoding gradient relative to the brain, regardless of which physical gradient was used.". This anisotropy itself is the fundamental principle underlying the modern method of MRI tractography and structural connectomics (the in vivo visualization the axonal fibers that connect neurons in the brain) . Chien and Kwong then used their early diffusion techniques to study human patients with stroke. In technically demanding circumstances (a low field MRI using conventional imaging, located in a parking lot trailer nearby the MGH) they were the first to demonstrate in human subjects the early drop in diffusivity seen in acute infarction in cats by Moseley.

Consistent with his joint appointment in the Massachusetts Eye and Ear Infirmary, he and his colleagues were able to demonstrate that MRI could be used to study diffusion and flow in the living eye. He and his colleagues pioneered the use of H_{2}O^{17} as a water tracer in MRI and demonstrated that this novel approach could be used to measure brain blood flow.

=== Functional MRI (fMRI) ===
In 1990, the MGH-NMR Center received the first clinical echo planar imaging (EPI) MRI instrument, capable of forming MRI images in 25 ms. The EPI method proved extremely powerful in the study of both perfusion and diffusion by allowing Kwong, and others, to evaluate dynamic changes in signal, such as the flow of blood labeled with injected magnetic contrast agents through the organ systems.

The MGH-NMR Center group, led by John (Jack) Belliveau, recognized that dynamic perfusion methods could be adapted to demonstrate perfusion changes that occur as a result of brain "work", e.g., the recruitment of localized areas of neural tissue as different parts of the brain participate in tasks. The landmark results of Belliveau, et al., in 1991, using dynamic susceptibility contrast heralded the creation of a new field in functional activity mapping of the human brain using magnetic resonance imaging - fMRI.

Two parallel developments in endogenous contrast set the stage of methods to map brain activity without injection of tracers or contrast agents. Contemporaneous work a decade earlier by Thulborn, and Wright at Stanford, had shown that blood oxygenation levels could be measured by NMR methods. Later groundbreaking experiments by Ogawa, et al., and by Turner had shown that oxygen depletion led to significant drops in MRI signal changes in large veins and the brain cortex itself, respectively, via a magnetic susceptibility mechanism analogous to that used by Belliveau with exogenous tracers, but in this case using deoxygenated blood itself as the contrast agent. At the same time, methods to directly measure brain perfusion using spin inverted water (arterial spin labeling) were pioneered in animal models by John Detre and Alan Koretsky. All of this was possible without the introduction of blood borne contrast agents.

With this background, Kwong reasoned that the concepts of functional mapping by brain perfusion, and the assessment of oxygenation from purely endogenous signals could be combined into an entirely new method of studying human brain activity. In the spring of 1991 he performed his first human experiments showing that large MRI signal changes were observable in the human brain following exposure to simple visual stimuli, using both blood oxygenation (BOLD) and flow contrast. The first dynamic video images of human brain activity appeared first at a meeting of the Society for Magnetic Resonance in Medicine in August 1991 in San Francisco in a plenary session by colleague Tom Brady, and was subsequently published in 1992 in the Proceedings of the National Academy of Sciences. (in the same year that Ogawa and colleagues submitted their results subsequently published a year later in PNAS. That same issue also included the work of Seiji Ogawa, then at Bell Labs, who had made similar findings. Most researchers credit Kwong and Ogawa independently with the discovery of what is now called Functional MRI (fMRI).

Kwong's first publication in this area, and his first experiments, demonstrated the two principal methods of functional brain imaging from endogenous signals. The oxygenation level dependent signal, known now as BOLD, has become the most popular because of its greater overall contrast/noise, but Kwong showed also that MRI could be used to detect a blood flow signal through the apparent change in T1 relaxation rates associated with the replenishment of blood in brain tissue, and demonstrated how the measured signal changes could be used to directly infer a quantitative measurement of the change in brain perfusion. This forms the basis of a second set of modern methods known now as arterial spin labeling, increasingly used when quantification of baseline and changing physiology is required. Kwong's was clearly the first work in this field to apply these methods to human brain mapping.

Functional MRI has proven extremely important in clinical and basic sciences. By February 2012 more than 299,000 manuscripts were matched by the term, "fMRI," on the PubMed database. This amounts to an average of more than 41 published manuscripts per day since the original method development 20 years earlier (24873 papers in 2011). To date no method has surpassed its combination of precision, safety and reliability in observing brain function. Kwong's discoveries were made while he was a research fellow.

=== Academic ===
In 1993, shortly after his fMRI discoveries, Kwong was made instructor in radiology. He advanced to an assistant professorship in 1997, and since 2000 has been an associate professor at the Harvard Medical School.

=== Continuing Research ===
Kwong is an active researcher, authoring or co-authoring 97 papers from 1992 to 2011, in the period following the initial fMRI publication. His most current work addresses problems in quantitative brain perfusion measurement as well as studies of brain effects of the traditional Chinese medical practice of acupuncture.
