= Angela D. Friederici =

German cognitive scientist (born 1952)

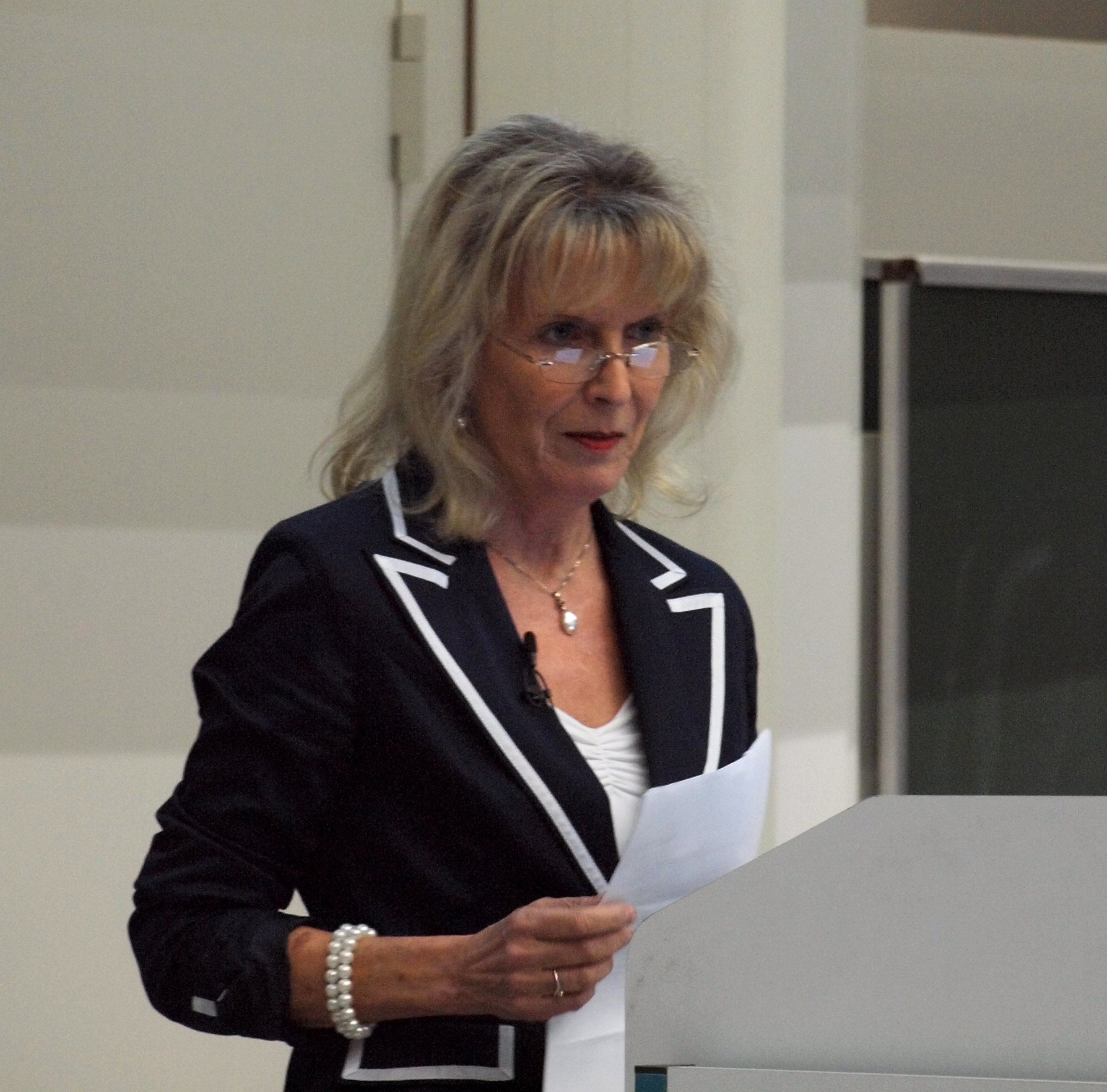
- Born: 1952 (age 73–74); Cologne, Germany
- Known for: First to report the early left anterior negativity (ELAN), a response to phrase structure violations in language, neurocognitive model of auditory language processing
- Awards: Alfried Krupp Prize for Young Scientists of the Alfried Krupp von Bohlen und Halbach Foundation; Gottfried Wilhelm Leibniz Prize of the German Research Foundation; University of Mainz endowed professor (Johannes Gutenberg-Stiftungsprofessur) 2010
- Scientific career
- Fields: Neuropsychology, Linguistics
- Workplaces: Max Planck Institute for Human Cognitive and Brain Sciences (professor, director)

Angela Friederici (born 1952) was a director at the Max Planck Institute for Human Cognitive and Brain Sciences in Leipzig, Germany, and is an internationally recognized expert in cognitive science, neurobiology, and linguistics. She is the author of over 400 academic articles and book chapters, and has edited 15 books on linguistics, neuroscience, language and psychology.

== Early life and career ==
Friederici was born in Cologne, Germany in 1952. From 1970 to 1976, she studied linguistics at the University of Bonn (Germany) and the University of Lausanne (Switzerland), graduating with Ph.D. in linguistics in 1976. In 1975, she also began studying psychology at the University of Bonn and graduated with a degree in psychology (German: Dipl.-Psych.) in 1980. In 1986, she completed her professorial degree (Habilitation) at the University of Giessen. After a post-doctoral scholarship at the Massachusetts Institute of Technology, and work as a research fellow at the Max Planck Institute for Psycholinguistics and the Paris Descartes University, Angela Friederici was awarded a professorship in cognitive psychology by the Free University of Berlin in 1989. In 1994, she became a Founding Director and Scientific Member of the Max Planck Institute of Cognitive Neuroscience in Leipzig, which became the Max Planck Institute for Human Cognitive and Brain Sciences in 2004.

Friederici also holds honorary professorships (Honorarprofessor) from the University of Leipzig (since 1995) for cognitive psychology, the University of Potsdam for Linguistics in the Faculty of Philosophy (since 1997) and for Medicine at the Charité, Humboldt-University Berlin (since 2004). Friederici's research centres on how the human brain processes language, examining both first and second language acquisition and use. She was the first to report the early left anterior negativity (ELAN), an EEG response to syntactic violations in sentences.

Her 2017 book Language in our Brain was endorsed by Noam Chomsky, in which she stated her current position on the genetics of language study regarding the FOXP2 gene. On page 222, Friederici states: "It has been proposed that FOXP2 is a gene that plays a major role in speech and language because the mutation of this gene was identified in a family with speech and language problems, although these were more speech-related rather than language problems as such. The view, however, has also been challenged for several reasons. One reason is that FOXP2 can also be found in non-human primates, mice, birds, and fish, thus in animals that do not speak."

== Awards and honors ==
- Alfred Krupp Prize for Young Scientists of the Alfried Krupp von Bohlen und Halbach Foundation 1990
- Gottfried Wilhelm Leibniz Prize of the German Research Foundation 1997
- University of Mainz endowed professor (Johannes Gutenberg-Stiftungsprofessur) 2010
- Carl Friedrich Gauss-Medal of the Brunswick Scientific Society (2011)
- Wilhelm Wundt Medal of the German Society of Psychology (2018)
- Order of Merit of the Free State of Saxony (2018)
- Elected Honorary Member of the Linguistic Society of America (2019)

She is a member of the Editorial or Scientific Advisory Boards of: Brain and Cognition (Action Editor), Brain and Language, Cognitive Neuroscience (Action Editor), Cognitive Science Quarterly, Gehirn & Geist, Journal of Cognitive Neuroscience, Journal of Memory and Language, Journal of Psycholinguistic Research, Neurolinguistik, Physiological Reviews, Psychonomic Bulletin & Review, Studies in Theoretical Psycholinguistics, The Mental Lexicon, Trends in Cognitive Sciences.

== Selected works ==
- Steinhauer, K.; Alter, K. & Friederici, A.D. (1999). "Brain potentials indicate immediate use of prosodic cues in natural speech processing". Nature Neuroscience. 2 (2): 191–196. doi:10.1038/5757. PMID 10195205. S2CID 7662734.
- Maess, B.; Koelsch, S.; Gunter, T.C. & Friederici A.D. (2001). "Musical syntax is processed in Broca's area: An MEG study". Nature Neuroscience. 4 (5): 540–545. doi:10.1038/87502. PMID 11319564. S2CID 1399938.
- Friederici, A.D. (2002). "Towards a neural basis of auditory sentence processing". Trends in Cognitive Sciences. 6 (2): 78–84. doi:10.1016/s1364-6613(00)01839-8. hdl:11858/00-001M-0000-0010-E573-8. PMID 15866191.
- Friederici, A.D.; Steinhauer, K. & Pfeifer, E. (2002). "Brain signatures of artificial language processing: Evidence challenging the critical period hypothesis". PNAS. 99 (1): 529–534. doi:10.1073/pnas.012611199. PMC 117594. PMID 11773629.
- Opitz, B. & Friederici, A.D. (2004). "Brain correlates of language learning: The neuronal dissociation of rule-based versus similarity-based learning". The Journal of Neuroscience. 24 (39): 8436–8440. doi:10.1523/jneurosci.2220-04.2004. PMC 6729909. PMID 15456816.
- Friederici, A.D.; Bahlmann, J.; Heim, S.; Schubotz, R.I. & Anwander, A. (2006). "The brain differentiates human and non-human grammars: Functional localization and structural connectivity". PNAS. 103 (7): 2458–2463. Bibcode:2006PNAS..103.2458F. doi:10.1073/pnas.0509389103. PMC 1413709. PMID 16461904.
- Friederici, A.D.; Fiebach, C.J.; Schlesewsky, M.; Bornkessel, I. & von Cramon, D.Y. (2006). "Processing linguistic complexity and grammaticality in the left frontal cortex". Cerebral Cortex. 16 (12): 1709–1717. doi:10.1093/cercor/bhj106. hdl:11858/00-001M-0000-0010-D26D-8. PMID 16400163.
- Friederici, A.D.; von Cramon, D.Y. & Kotz, S.A. (2007). "Role of the corpus callosum in speech comprehension: Interfacing syntax and prosody". Neuron. 53 (1): 135–145. doi:10.1016/j.neuron.2006.11.020. PMID 17196536. S2CID 2428457.
- Makuuchi, M.; Bahlmann, J.; Anwander, A. & Friederici, A.D. (2009). "Segregating the core computational faculty of human language from working memory". PNAS. 106 (20): 8362–8367. Bibcode:2009PNAS..106.8362M. doi:10.1073/pnas.0810928106. PMC 2688876. PMID 19416819.
- Friederici, A.D.; Kotz, S.A.; Scott, S.K. & Obleser, J. (2010). "Disentangling syntax and intelligibility in auditory language comprehension". Human Brain Mapping. 31 (3): 448–457. doi:10.1002/hbm.20878. PMC 6870868. PMID 19718654.
- Friederici, A.D.; Chomsky, Noam (2017). "Language, mind, brain". Nature Human Behavior. 1 (10): 713–722. doi:10.1038/s41562-017-0184-4. PMID 31024099.
