= James B. Grinder =

American serial killer (1945–2010)

- Born: 1945
- Died: 2010 (aged 64–65)
- Occupation: Woodcutter
- Children: 1
- Conviction: First degree murder (2 counts)
- Penalty: Life imprisonment

Details
- Victims: 4
- Span of crimes: 1976–1984
- Country: United States
- States: Arkansas; Missouri
- Date apprehended: March 1998

James B. Grinder (1945–2010) was an American serial killer and rapist who murdered three teenage girls in Arkansas and a woman in Missouri between 1976 and 1984. Grinder was not apprehended until his confession in March 1998. However, authorities still had little evidence tying Grinder to the murders, so they used a technique known as brain fingerprinting to help prove his guilt. In 1999, Grinder was convicted of the four murders and sentenced to life imprisonment. He remained imprisoned until his death in 2010.

== Biography ==
James B. Grinder was born in 1945. In 1980, Grinder had a daughter, but he and his child's mother split up soon afterward. He later moved to Macon County, Missouri.

== Murders ==
=== Triple murder ===
On December 2, 1976, Grinder picked up Teresa Williams, 13, Crystal Donita Parton, 14, and Cynthia Mabry, 13, outside Russellville, Arkansas. According to Grinder, the three girls voluntarily got into his car after he offered to buy them alcohol. After purchasing alcohol in Morrilton, he drove them to Brock Cemetery where he raped Williams and Parton. He then strangled them and stabbed them in the neck before hiding their bodies under some brush off a nearby dead-end road. He then took Mabry, who was still alive, into a forest and raped her. Grinder then attempted to bludgeon her to death with a soda bottle. However, Mabry was still alive, so he beat her to death with a tire iron.

According to Grinder's then girlfriend, he came home at about midnight. He told her about the missing girls and asked her to say that he'd been with her all night if anyone asked. Grinder also gave her $200. About a week after the murders, Grinder returned to the cemetery to cover Williams and Parton's remains with more brush.

Grinder soon became a suspect in the disappearances after Teresa Williams' cousin told police he saw Grinder with Williams that day. Grinder told investigators that he saw the girls hitchhiking and picked them up, but he dropped them off at the interstate exit for Pottsville. Since the victims' remains had not yet been found, and Grinder had an alibi, police assumed the girls were runaways.

The skeletal remains of Teresa Williams and Crystal Parton were found by a deer hunter in 1986. Cynthia Mabry's body has never been found.

=== Julianne Helton ===
On the early morning of January 8, 1984, the car of Julianne Helton, 25, was found by Missouri State Highway Patrol at the Marceline junction in Macon County, Missouri. Helton's parents filed a missing persons report after she failed to come home from a party in New Cambria the night before. Investigators immediately suspected foul play in her death, noting her car had been sabotaged. A search party was soon assembled, and they searched for her in Macon and Linn counties. On January 11, 1984, two volunteer searchers and railroad workers found Helton's fully-clothed body in a field near tracks of the Santa Fe railroad – eight miles northwest of where her car had been found. She had been raped, beaten, and stabbed to death by Grinder. Her hands were also bound in front with baling twine and her right hand showed defensive wounds. Helton's purse and the weapon used to stab her were missing.

== Arrest and trials ==
Dr. Lawrence Farwell conducting a brain fingerprinting test on James B. Grinder

In March 1998, Grinder and two others were arrested for burglary. Grinder had long been a suspect in Julianne Helton's murder, but police could not find enough evidence to arrest him. After his arrest for burglary, police offered him a plea deal for life in prison, so he confessed. Upon hearing that Grinder confessed to Helton's murder, Russellville police traveled to Macon County to question him about the murders of Teresa Williams, Crystal Parton, and Cynthia Mabry. Grinder also confessed to these murders, providing details only the perpetrator would know.

However, there was a problem with Grinder's confession to Julianne Helton's murder. Grinder had changed his story many times, even contradicting himself at points. Since police had no physical evidence connecting Grinder to the murder, his confession was essential for a conviction. In June 1999, Sheriff Robert Dawson contacted Lawrence Farwell, a neuropsychiatrist and the inventor of brain fingerprinting, a scientific technique used to determine information stored in a subject's brain.

Grinder agreed to take the test, so Farwell went to Macon County and set up his equipment in the prison where Grinder was being held. Grinder sat in front of a computer screen with the device strapped to his head while Farwell asked him questions about the crime. Grinder's brain waves revealed that he knew detailed information about the murder that only the perpetrator would know.

Six days after the brain fingerprinting test, Grinder pleaded guilty to Julianne Helton's murder and was sentenced to life in prison. He was then extradited to Arkansas to face trial for the murders of Williams, Parton, and Mabry. He pleaded guilty to those murders as well and was given another life sentence.

In 2010, James B. Grinder died in prison from natural causes.
