= Moran Cerf =

American-French-Israeli neuroscientist and business professor

- מורן סרף
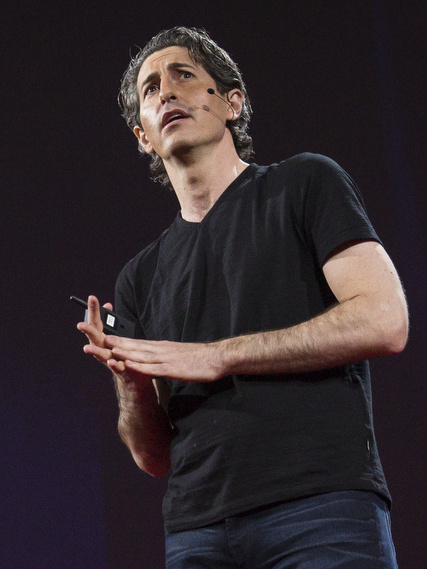
- Born: 1977 (age 48–49); Paris, France
- Citizenship: French, Israeli, American
- Education: Tel Aviv University (BS, MA); Caltech (PhD)
- Occupations: Neuroscientist, white hat hacker
- Known for: Research on applications of neuroscience in business; Studying humans with electrodes inside their brain during surgery; Science consulting in films; brains; Dream research; Free will; Consciousness; Neural correlates of engagement in the brain;
- Website: morancerf.com

Moran Cerf (Hebrew: מורן סרף; born 1977) is an American-French-Israeli neuroscientist, professor of business (at Columbia University), investor and former white hat hacker.

He is the founder of Think-Alike and B-Cube and the host and curator of PopTech, one of the top 5 leading conferences in the world. Cerf is also the president and co-founder of the Human Single Neuron society. As of 2013, he is a member of the Northwestern Institute on Complex Systems.

Cerf has received numerous awards including the Templeton Foundation "Extraordinary Minds" award, and the Chicagoan award. In 2016 he was named one of the "40 Leading Professors Below 40". He has won several national storytelling competitions, most notably The Moth GrandSLAM, multiple times.

Cerf is the Alfred P. Sloan screenwriting professor at the American Film Institute (AFI) where he teaches an annual workshop on science in films. He is also a science consultant to Hollywood films and TV series (Limitless, Bull, Falling Water, etc.).

He has spoken publicly on topics of neuroscience, business, decision making and hacking (TED, PopTech, Google, TEDx, TED-Ed) and his views on the risks of hacking into humans' brains often appear in the media.

== Early life and background ==
Cerf was born in Paris, France, to a Jewish family, and raised in Israel. As a child, he attended the Israeli School of Arts and appeared on Israeli children's television. In 2002, he hosted a weekly radio show.

Cerf began programming as a child and was active in hacker communities.

== Education ==
Cerf holds a Bachelor of Science in Physics (1998–2000), and a Master's Degree in Philosophy (2000) from Tel Aviv University.

In 2002, he received the prestigious Presidential Scholarship award in Israel while originally pursuing a PhD in philosophy. In 2005 he shifted to neuroscience, and ultimately completed a PhD in neuroscience at Caltech (2009).

While pursuing his studies, Cerf worked as a white hat hacker in the emerging Israeli cybersecurity industry, performing penetration tests for banks and government institutes. He attributes much of his understanding of the brain and the way he researches to his time spent breaking codes and performing penetration tests. A single meeting with the late Francis Crick where the two discussed the importance of "using hacking skills to study the most interesting vault in the world – our brain" made Prof. Cerf leave his senior business post and pursue full-time PhD at Caltech, under Prof. Christof Koch.

Cerf completed his PhD at Caltech during 2005–2009 and worked on one of the flagship projects in neuroscience: "Single Neuron Recording in Humans". This project involves studying humans using direct recordings from their brains while they are awake with electrodes implanted inside their heads. This research setup gained him worldwide recognition and resulted in some of the widely cited publications that positioned Cerf at the forefront of neuroscience research.

Following his time at Caltech Professor Cerf moved to NYU, where he spent three years studying what makes content engaging and looking for ways to translate his neuroscience research to a broader audience. During this time investgated ways to understand how to translate brain research to applications and work together with the business world to communicate science.

Following his time at NYU studying engagement, and with the growth of public attention to his work (in part due to his repeated wins of the Moth Grandslam story-telling competition, where he discussed the behind the scenes of neuroscience), Prof. Cerf became a public figure in the science communication sphere where his talks garnered a large following.

In 2014 Cerf was appointed as a professor at the Kellogg School of Management, where he holds positions as both a business and neuroscience professor.

In 2016 he joined the MIT Media Lab as a visiting professor, where he started his work on dream recording and manipulation.

== Notable research ==
Cerf is well known for his research on consciousness and projecting people's thoughts and dreams directly from their brain, his research on free will, his ideas on the future of humans and the ability to hack our brains, and for his work in the neuroscience in marketing. Applications include predicting people's interest and engagement with content by observing their neural responses. For this work, he was named by Prof. Phil Kotler (father of modern marketing) "the next leader in marketing". He is a frequent contributor to "Business Insider", "Forbes" and various other popular media journals where he writes on topics in neuroscience and business and ways to implement science in decision-making.

In his 2016 TED talk, Cerf discussed a method for extraction of dreams which he was rumored to turn into a company, Dream-Alike. Similar mention of his work on projecting thoughts was later discussed in a blog post at ‘Wait But Why’.

== Career ==
Prior to his academic career, Cerf held positions in pharmaceutical, telecommunications, fashion, software development, and innovative research fields.

=== Hacking ===
Cerf spent nearly a decade working as a computer system hacker, breaking into financial and government institutes to test and improve their security.

As a hacker, Cerf was first working for Check Point, and later started his own for-hire ‘white hat’ hackers team that helped business secure their systems from malevolent hackers. His team later integrated into the ADC (Advanced Defense Center) at a then-startup company called Imperva (now a NASDAQ traded company) where Cerf ran the ADC and spent a number of years before leaving for academia, holding various managerial positions.

Some of Cerf's stories about hacking and his experiences as a hacker were included in various films and became the basis for his worldwide acclaim.

=== Neuroscience ===
In an interview with Forbes, Professor Cerf attributed his success as a neuroscientist to his hacking background, saying the non-traditional tools he uses to investigate the brain and his creative way of thinking about black boxes borrows from his time breaking codes. Cerf is known for his pioneering work studying patients undergoing brain-surgery, which allows him to investigate behavior, emotion, decision making, and dreams by directly recording the activity of individual neurons using electrodes implanted in the patient's brain.

As a business professor, Cerf's work focuses on drivers of decision-making in consumer neuroscience, and using neuro-marketing techniques to gain insights about consumer behavior. He is an associate editor for several scholarly journals in both business and neuroscience and a consultant for companies in many industries, including automotive (Ferrari), performance (Red Bull), finance (TransUnion), and relationships (Tinder).

=== Hollywood ===
Since 2007, Cerf has held a permanent appointment at the American Film Institute (AFI) as the Alfred P. Sloan Professor, where he teaches an annual workshop on science communication in film and TV. Through this workshop he has worked on various films and TV shows. He also organizes the annual Sloan seminar, where he has held public discussions on science communication with Hollywood figures like Ann Druyan (Cosmos), Michelle Ashford (Masters of Sex), Whitney Cummings (Whitney, 2 Broke Girls), Giancarlo Esposito (Breaking Bad), Jake Gyllenhaal (Donnie Darko), Len Mlodinow (ghost writer of Stephen Hawking's books and writer on MacGyver), Andy Serkis (King Kong, Gollum in Lord of the Rings), Michael Begler and Jack Amiel (The Knick), Clifford Johnson (theoretical physicist) and more.

== Books ==
- Competition and Attention in the Human Brain: Single neuron recordings and eye-tracking in healthy controls and subjects with neurological and psychiatric disorders, Lap Lambert Academic Publishing, 2012, ISBN 9783844309591
- Single Neuron Studies of the Human Brain: Probing Cognition, co-authored with Itzhak Fried and Ueli Rutishauser and Gabriel Kreiman, The MIT Press, 2014, ISBN 9780262323994
- Consumer Neuroscience, MIT Press, 2017, ISBN 9780262036597
- Foresight, Northwestern University, 2017, ISBN 978-1983736643

== Awards and recognition ==
- 2016: 40 Leading Professors Below 40
- 2010, 2016: 2 times US champion of the Moth Grand-Slam

== Filmography ==
Year	Film
2016	Limitless
2016	Bull
2016	Mr. Robot
2016	Falling Water
2016	Clarity
2017	Impact Theory
2019	The Chef
2021	Israelis who change the world (Episode 3: Moran's Brain)
2021	Gutfeld!
2021	The Mind, Explained
2022	Inside the Mind of a Con Artist
2022	The Future Of

== Philanthropy ==
In 2018, Cerf founded B-Cube, a non-profit that helps organizations use advances in neuroscience to change behavior. While B-Cube's endeavors are not public, it is estimated that they invested shy of $12M in 2018 in their projects. B-Cube has worked with Ferrari (on improving risk assessment in driving), with SS&C (on ways to improve learning in classrooms), with Viacom (on applications of neuroscience to entertainment) and with Founders Pledge (on using neuroscience for social good).

As Cerf is the host and curator of PopTech and responsible for their fellows program, B-Cube may also be involved in the PopTech mission for social good promotion through technology.

Cerf has spoken at the UN and various organizations on ways to use neuroscience and research to promote young individuals’ rise out of poverty, on the ethics of using neuroscience to prevent threats to democracy and on the dangers of the attention economy.

== Government ==
Cerf worked with the United States Digital Service (USDS) under President Obama, and continued working with 18F during the Trump administration. His work focused on cybersecurity, in particular the ‘login.gov’ project.

== Personal life ==
In 2017, Cerf dated actress Ashley Judd. They were last seen together at the Sundance Film Festival. In 2011–2012 Cerf dated actress Kristina Anapau (True Blood). In 2016, Cerf was selected as one of Elle Magazine’s most eligible bachelors.

In his free time, Cerf is a pilot of private jets and helicopters.

== Board and other posts ==
- Board member, Chicago Ideas
- Host and curator, PopTech
- Co-founder, Human Intracranial Research Foundation
- Board member, VR Americas
- Co-Founder, ThinkAlike
- Founder (rumored), DreamAlike
- Presidential Innovation Fellow, White House USDS/18F
- Founder, B-Cube

== See also ==
- List of neuroscientists
- List of hackers
- David Eagleman
- Dan Ariely
- Bryan Johnson (entrepreneur)
- Elon Musk
