= Physiological Reviews =

- Discipline: Physiology
- Language: English
- Edited by: Sadis Matalon (2018 to present)

Publication details
- History: 1921–present
- Publisher: The American Physiological Society (United States)
- Frequency: Quarterly
- Impact factor: 37.312 (2020)

Standard abbreviations
- ISO 4: Physiol. Rev.

Indexing
- ISSN: 0031-9333 (print); 1522-1210 (web)

Links
- Journal homepage

Physiological Reviews is a journal published quarterly by the American Physiological Society which has been published since 1921. The editor in chief of the journal is Sadis Matalon (University of Alabama at Birmingham). The journal's first managing editor, who served to his death in 1946, was Dr. Donald R. Hooker. Among the cadre of editors at the journal's inception were William Henry Howell, Lafayette Mendel, and John Macleod. From 1932 to 1950, the chairman of the board of editors of the journal was Anton J. Carlson. Other notable people who have served on the journal's editorial board include John Jacob Abel (c. 1935), Ernest William Goodpasture (c.1938).

According to the Journal Citation Reports, the journal has a 2020 impact factor of 37.312

ISI Impact Factor (rounded) & Rank among Physiology Journals
2013	2014	2015	2016	2017	2018	2019	2020
29.0	27.324	30.924	27.312	24.014	24.250	25.588	37.312
Rank 1 among Physiology Journals

Internet Archive page set (values in table linked to specific pages)
