= Communitas =

Latin noun for an unstructured community

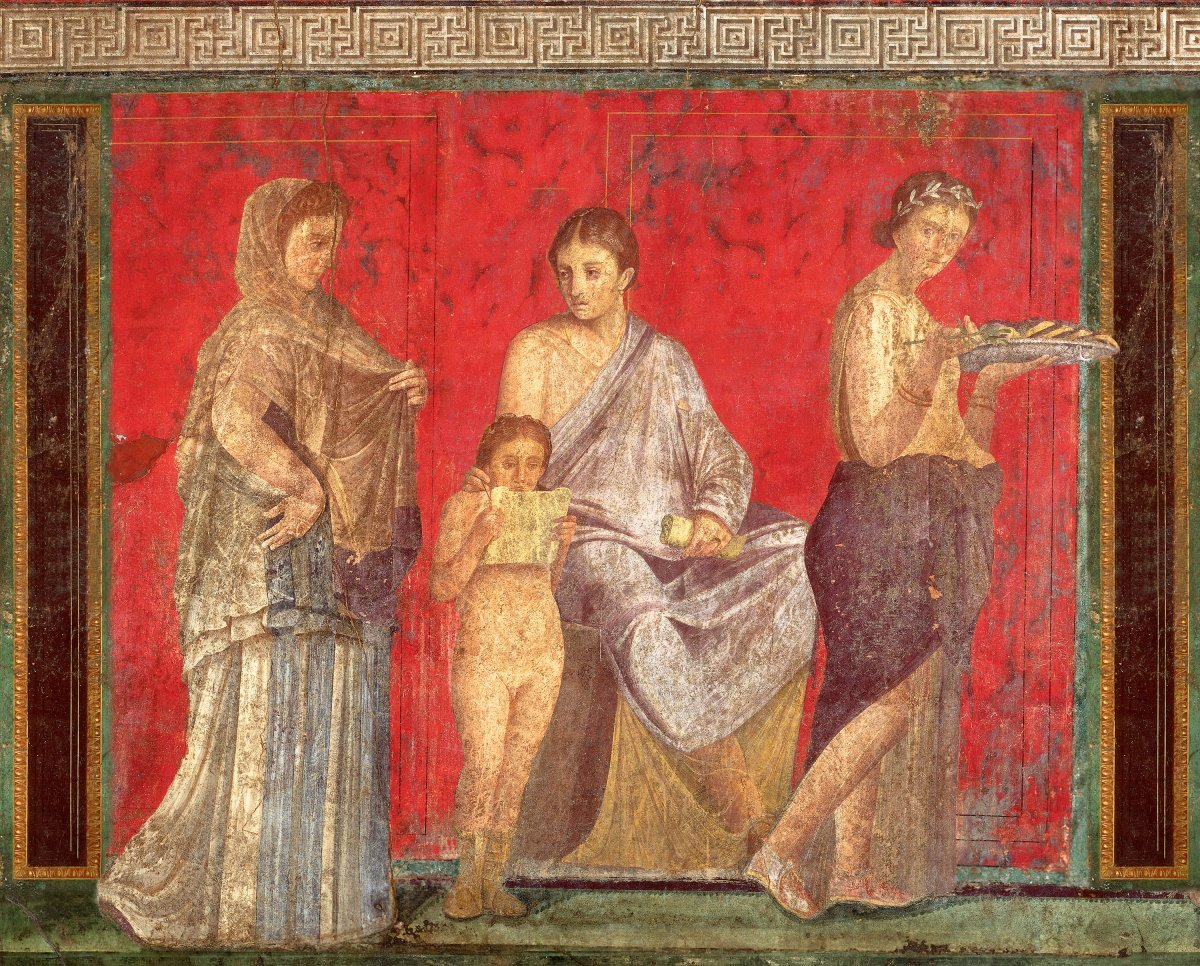
Initiation at the Villa of Mysteries, Pompeii, a rite of passage expressing communitas

Communitas is a Latin noun commonly referring either to an unstructured community in which people are equal, or to the very spirit of community. It also has special significance as a loanword in cultural anthropology and the social sciences. Victor Turner, who defined the anthropological usage of communitas, was interested in the interplay between what he called social 'structure' and 'antistructure'; Liminality and Communitas are both components of antistructure.

Communitas refers to an unstructured state in which all members of a community are equal allowing them to share a common experience, usually through a rite of passage. Communitas is characteristic of people experiencing liminality together. This term is used to distinguish the modality of social relationship from an area of common living. There is more than one distinction between structure and communitas. The most familiar is the difference of secular and sacred. Every social position has something sacred about it. This sacred component is acquired during rites of passages, through the changing of positions. Part of this sacredness is achieved through the transient humility learned in these phases, this allows people to reach a higher position.

== Victor and Edith Turner ==
Communitas is an acute point of community. It takes community to the next level and allows the whole of the community to share a common experience, usually through a rite of passage. This brings everyone onto an equal level: even if you are higher in position, you have been lower and you know what that is.

Turner (1969, Pg.132; see also) distinguishes between:

- existential or spontaneous communitas, the transient personal experience of togetherness; e.g. that which occurs during a counter-culture happening.
- normative communitas, which occurs as communitas is transformed from its existential state to being organized into a permanent social system due to the need for social control.
- ideological communitas, which can be applied to many utopian social models.

Communitas as a concept used by Victor Turner in his study of ritual has been criticized by anthropologists such as John Eade and Michael J. Sallnow's book Contesting the Sacred (1991).

At the heart of Turner’s theory is the notion that communitas involves a connection to the sacred, elicits powerful emotional experiences, and plays a key role in revitalizing social bonds and energies. In this sense, Turner’s work is closely linked to Durkheim’s The Elementary Forms of Religious Life. Although Turner does not directly reference Durkheim’s seminal work in The Ritual Process, it is clear that Durkheim's ideas on collective effervescence form a fundamental part of Turner’s argument. For instance, Turner states:

“Spontaneous communitas is richly charged with affects, mainly pleasurable ones. Life in "structure" is filled with objective difficulties... Spontaneous communitas has something magical about it. Subjectively there is in it the feeling of endless power... Structural action swiftly becomes arid and mechanical if those involved in it are not periodically immersed in the regenerative abyss of communitas.”

Edith Turner, Victor's widow and anthropologist in her own right, published in 2011 a definitive overview of the anthropology of communitas, outlining the concept in relation to the natural history of joy, including the nature of human experience and its narration, festivals, music and sports, work, disaster, the sacred, revolution and nonviolence, nature and spirit, and ritual and rites of passage.

== Paul and Percival Goodman ==
Communitas is also the title of a book published in 1947 by the 20th-century American thinker and writer Paul Goodman and his brother, Percival Goodman. Their book examines three kinds of possible societies: a society centered on consumption, a society centered on artistic and creative pursuits, and a society which maximizes human liberty. The Goodmans emphasize freedom from both coercion by a government or church and from human necessities by providing these free of cost to all citizens who do a couple of years of conscripted labor as young adults.

== Roberto Esposito ==
In 1998, Italian philosopher Roberto Esposito published a book under the name Communitas challenging the traditional understanding of this concept. It was translated in English in 2010 by Timothy Campbell. In this book, Esposito offers a very different interpretation of the concept of communitas based on a thorough etymological analysis of the word: "Community isn't a property, nor is it a territory to be separated and defended against those who do not belong to it. Rather, it is a void, a debt, a gift to the other that also reminds us of our constitutive alterity with respect to ourselves." He goes on with his "deconstruction" of the concept of communitas:

"From here it emerges that communitas is the totality of persons united not by a "property" but precisely by an obligation or a debt; not by an "addition" but by a "subtraction": by a lack, a limit that is configured as an onus, or even as a defective modality for him who is "affected", unlike for him who is instead "exempt" or "exempted". Here we find the final and most characteristic of the oppositions associated with (or that dominate) the alternative between public and private, those in other words that contrast communitas to immunitas. If communis is he who is required to carry out the functions of an office ― or to the donation of a grace ― on the contrary, he is called immune who has to perform no office, and for that reason he remains ungrateful. He can completely preserve his own position through a vacatio muneris. Whereas the communitas is bound by the sacrifice of the compensatio, the immunitas implies the beneficiary of the dispensatio."

"Therefore the community cannot be thought of as a body, as a corporation in which individuals are founded in a larger individual. Neither is community to be interpreted as a mutual, intersubjective "recognition" in which individuals are reflected in each other so as to confirm their initial identity; as a collective bond that comes at a certain point to connect individuals that before were separate. The community isn't a mode of being, much less a "making" of the individual subject. It isn't the subject's expansion or multiplication but its exposure to what interrupts the closing and turns it inside out: a dizziness, a syncope, a spasm in the continuity of the subject."

== Rethinking Community ==
Roberto Esposito’s Communitas represents just one contribution in a larger debate about the meaning of community, which centered around the question of the “European Community.” A series of philosophers questioned whether the closed, exclusionary, and identitarian models of community found in the traditions of Communitarianism in Anglo-American philosophy and Classical Social Theory, were suitable for our globalized world. Instead of abandoning the desire to belong in a community, each philosopher attempts to reconceptualize community in an open and inclusive manner. Jean-Luc Nancy is credited with starting this debate with his book The Inoperative Community, followed by Maurice Blanchot’s The Unavowable Community, Giorgio Agamben’s The Coming Community, and Roberto Esposito’s Communitas. Jean-Luc Nancy revised his theory of community in Being Singular Plural, and he delivered a series of reflections on the terms and motifs of this debate in The Disavowed Community.

Greg Bird provides an overview of this debate in Containing Community. Rémi Astruc, a French scholar, also covers this debate in his essay "Nous? L'aspiration à la Communauté et les arts." On the American side, see The Community of Those Who Have Nothing in Common by Alphonso Lingis and Miranda Joseph’s Against the Romance of Community. For Christian perspectives, see Taylor Weaver's The Scandal of Community, and Alan Hirsch’s The Forgotten Ways.
