= Aditi Lahiri =

Anglo-Indian linguist

Aditi Lahiri CBE FBA (born 1952 in Calcutta, India) is an Indian-born British linguist and Professor emerita of Linguistics at the University of Oxford. She held the Chair of Linguistics at the University of Oxford from 2007 until her retirement in 2022; she was a Fellow of Somerville College, Oxford. Her main research interests are in phonology, phonetics, historical linguistics, psycholinguistics, and neurolinguistics.

== Early life and education ==
Lahiri was born on 14 July 1952 in Calcutta, India. She was educated at the Bethune College, Kolkata, India, and later the University of Calcutta. She earned two doctorates; one from the University of Calcutta in comparative philology and one in linguistics from Brown University.

== Academic career ==
Lahiri has taught at the University of California, Los Angeles and at the University of California, Santa Cruz, and worked as a research scientist at the Max Planck Institute for Psycholinguistics in the Netherlands and as a professor at the University of Konstanz.

She held the Chair of Linguistics at the University of Oxford and was a fellow of Somerville College, Oxford, from 2007 until her retirement in 2022.

She was Director of the Language and Brain Lab and Principal Investigator of the MORPHON project (Resolving Morpho-Phonological Alternation: Historical, Neurolinguistic, and Computational Approaches), funded by the European Research Council.

== Honours ==
In 2007, Lahiri was elected a Member of the Academia Europaea. In 2010, she was elected a Fellow of the British Academy (FBA).

She received the Gottfried Wilhelm Leibniz Prize in 2000.

Lahiri was appointed Commander of the Order of the British Empire (CBE) in the 2020 New Year Honours for services to the study of linguistics.
