= Max Planck Institute for Human Cognitive and Brain Sciences =

Research institute in Leipzig, Germany

Coordinates: 51°20′05″N 12°23′19″E

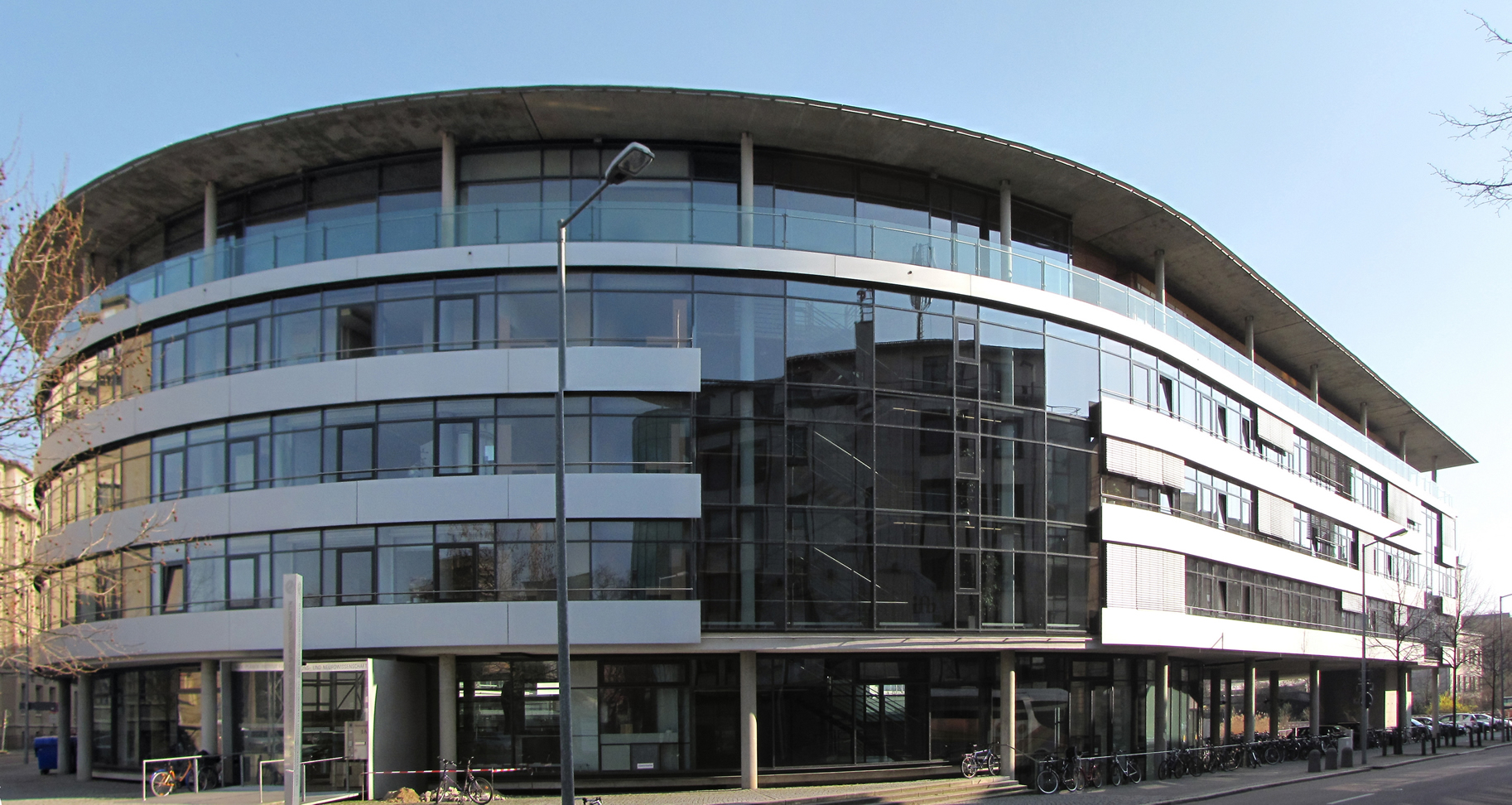
Max Planck Institute for Human Cognitive and Brain Sciences in Leipzig

The Max Planck Institute for Human Cognitive and Brain Sciences is located in Leipzig, Germany. The institute was founded in 2004 by a merger between the former Max Planck Institute of Cognitive Neuroscience in Leipzig and the Max Planck Institute for Psychological Research in Munich. It is one of 86 institutes in the Max Planck Society (Max Planck Gesellschaft). Research at the Max Planck Institute for Human Cognitive and Brain Sciences revolves around human cognitive abilities and cerebral processes, with a focus on the neural basis of brain functions like language, emotions, music and action.

== Departments ==
- Neurology - Director: Professor Arno Villringer
- Neurophysics - Director: Professor Nikolaus Weiskopf
- Psychology - Director: Professor Christian Doeller

== Former Departments ==
- Neuropsychology - Director: Professor Angela D. Friederici
- Social Neuroscience - Director: Professor Tania Singer
- Neurophysics - Director: Professor Robert Turner
- Psychology - Director: Professor Wolfgang Prinz
- Cognitive Neurology - Director: Professor D. Yves von Cramon
