= Blood-oxygenation-level–dependent imaging =

Type of magnetic resonance imaging

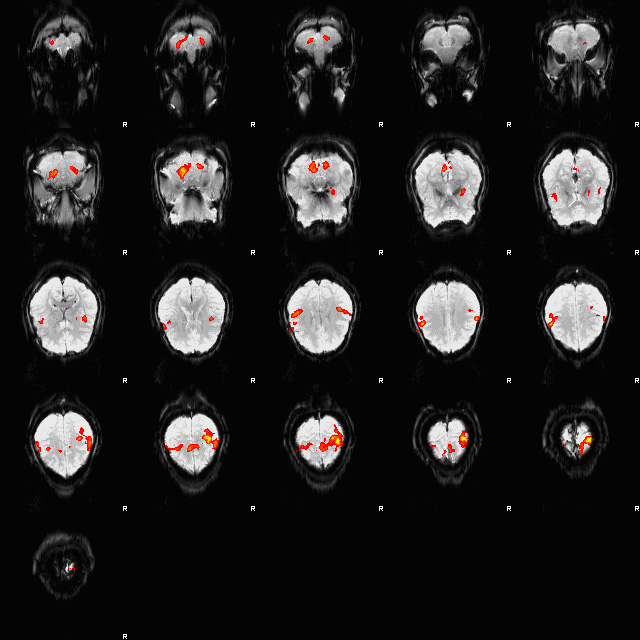
An fMRI depiction of activated brain areas (BOLD) during an index finger-tapping sequence.

Blood-oxygenation-level–dependent imaging, or BOLD-contrast imaging, is a method used in functional magnetic resonance imaging (fMRI) to observe the Blood-oxygenation-level in different areas of the brain or other organs, which are found to be active at any given time.

== Theory ==
Neurons do not have internal reserves of energy in the form of sugar and oxygen, so their firing causes a need for more energy to be brought in quickly. Through a process called the haemodynamic response, blood releases oxygen to active neurons at a greater rate than to inactive neurons. This causes a change of the relative levels of oxyhemoglobin and deoxyhemoglobin (oxygenated or deoxygenated blood) that can be detected on the basis of their differential magnetic susceptibility.

In 1990, three papers published by Seiji Ogawa and colleagues showed that hemoglobin has different magnetic properties in its oxygenated and deoxygenated forms (deoxygenated hemoglobin is paramagnetic and oxygenated hemoglobin is diamagnetic), both of which could be detected using MRI. This leads to magnetic signal variation which can be detected using an MRI scanner. Given many repetitions of a thought, action or experience, statistical methods can be used to determine the areas of the brain which reliably have more of this difference as a result, and therefore which areas of the brain are most active during that thought, action or experience.

== Criticism and limitations ==
Although most fMRI research uses BOLD contrast imaging as a method to determine which parts of the brain are most active, because the signals are relative, and not individually quantitative, some question its rigor. Other methods which propose to measure neural activity directly have been attempted (for example, measurement of the Oxygen Extraction Fraction, or OEF, in regions of the brain, which measures how much of the oxyhemoglobin in the blood has been converted to deoxyhemoglobin), but because the electromagnetic fields created by an active or firing neuron are so weak, the signal-to-noise ratio is extremely low and statistical methods used to extract quantitative data have been largely unsuccessful so far.

The typical discarding of the low-frequency signals in BOLD-contrast imaging came into question in 1995, when it was observed that the "noise" in the area of the brain that controls right-hand movement fluctuated in unison with similar activity in the area on the opposite side of the brain associated with left-hand movement. BOLD-contrast imaging is only sensitive to differences between two brain states, so a new method was needed to analyse these correlated fluctuations called resting state fMRI.

== History ==
The proof of concept of BOLD-contrast imaging was provided by Seiji Ogawa and Colleagues in 1990, following an experiment which demonstrated that an in vivo change of blood oxygenation could be detected with MRI. In Ogawa's experiments, blood-oxygenation-level–dependent imaging of rodent brain slice contrast in different components of the air. At high magnetic fields, water proton magnetic resonance images of brains of live mice and rats under anesthetization have been measured by a gradient echo pulse sequence. Experiments shown that when the content of oxygen in the breathing gas changed gradually, the contrast of these images changed gradually. Ogawa proposed and proved that the oxyhemoglobin and deoxyhemoglobin is the major contribution of this difference.

Other notable pioneers of BOLD fMRI include Kenneth Kwong and colleagues, who first used the technique in human participants in 1992, and Kamil Ugurbil and team who also demonstrated the first use of BOLD fMRI in humans in work contemporaneous and independent from the work by Kwong et al.

== See also ==
- Amplitude of low frequency fluctuations
- MRI sequences
