= Brain fingerprinting =

Forensic science technique using EEG to detect concealed information

Brain fingerprinting (BF) is a forensic science technique that uses electroencephalography (EEG)–measured event-related brain potentials to assess whether specific information is stored in a person's memory. The approach was first published in 1991 by Farwell and Donchin and later described by Farwell in a forensic science encyclopedia entry. In a typical test, words or images that contain crime-relevant details are interleaved with neutral items; recognition-related brain responses are compared across item types to infer whether the examinee possesses knowledge of those details.

Courts in the United States have addressed the admissibility of BF evidence. In Harrington v. State (Iowa), the district court ruled the results admissible, and the Iowa Supreme Court later discussed the evidence in the appeal. Legal commentators have analyzed BF's evidentiary status and implications.

== Method and P300 response ==
Brain fingerprinting uses EEG electrodes placed on the scalp to record event-related potentials (ERPs) while the subject views probe (crime-relevant) and irrelevant stimuli. A positive-going ERP component peaking roughly 300–800 ms after stimulus onset—the P300—has been studied since the 1960s as an index of context updating and recognition. The recognition-related response is used to detect whether information is present in memory; it is not itself a determination of guilt or innocence.

Unlike a traditional polygraph examination—which relies largely on autonomic measures such as electrodermal and cardiovascular activity—BF focuses on neural responses to recognition probes. Research on the related concealed information test has examined both autonomic and ERP measures across numerous laboratory studies.

== History ==
Farwell and Donchin's 1991 paper proposed using ERPs for concealed-information detection and reported initial laboratory evidence. In 1999, BF was reported in connection with the investigation of the 1984 murder of Julie Helton in Missouri involving James B. Grinder; coverage described the use of ERPs during the investigation and Grinder's subsequent confession and imprisonment.

In 2001 the U.S. General Accounting Office (GAO, now the Government Accountability Office) surveyed federal agencies and reported skepticism about prospective operational use, citing limited applicability to federal missions. Academic and legal commentary continued in the early 2000s, including discussions of potential uses and constraints in criminal procedure.

Reports and commentary have noted investigations and demonstrations outside the United States, including in India and New Zealand, though BF has not achieved widespread courtroom use internationally.

== Legal status ==
In the United States, BF evidence was ruled admissible by an Iowa district court in Harrington v. State; subsequent appellate proceedings in 2003 addressed the case and the evidentiary record. Law reviews discuss BF under Daubert and related evidentiary frameworks, comparing it with polygraph and other scientific testimony.

== Criticism and debate ==
Scholars have raised methodological and interpretive concerns about BF and related ERP-based memory detection, including stimulus selection, countermeasures, and generalization from laboratory paradigms. Farwell and colleagues have replied, emphasizing published accuracy claims and test protocols.

Published laboratory and field reports using BF-style ERP measures include claims of high accuracy and low error rates; assessments by other researchers have urged caution and further independent validation before routine forensic adoption.

== Current research and related uses ==
Two pilot studies and legal analyses in New Zealand have evaluated "forensic brainwave analysis", a family of ERP-based approaches that includes BF, and called for further research on foundational validity and reliability. BF and ERP-based concealed-information tests have also been discussed in broader reviews of forensic psychophysiology. The technique has received periodic media coverage.

Outside the forensic context, the term "brain fingerprinting" has also been used in cognitive neuroscience to describe functional connectome fingerprinting, which identifies individuals using patterns of resting-state or task-based brain connectivity; some authors have proposed future clinical applications of such connectivity-based individual identification.

== See also ==
- Forensic science
