= Meanings of minor-planet names: 255001–256000 =

As minor planet discoveries are confirmed, they are given a permanent number by the IAU's Minor Planet Center (MPC), and the discoverers can then submit names for them, following the IAU's naming conventions. The list below concerns those minor planets in the specified number-range that have received names, and explains the meanings of those names.

Official naming citations of newly named small Solar System bodies are approved and published in a bulletin by IAU's Working Group for Small Bodies Nomenclature (WGSBN). Before May 2021, citations were published in MPC's Minor Planet Circulars for many decades. Recent citations can also be found on the JPL Small-Body Database (SBDB). Until his death in 2016, German astronomer Lutz D. Schmadel compiled these citations into the Dictionary of Minor Planet Names (DMP) and regularly updated the collection.

Based on Paul Herget's The Names of the Minor Planets, Schmadel also researched the unclear origin of numerous asteroids, most of which had been named prior to World War II. This article incorporates text from this source, which is in the public domain: SBDB New namings may only be added to this list below after official publication as the preannouncement of names is condemned. The WGSBN publishes a comprehensive guideline for the naming rules of non-cometary small Solar System bodies.

== 255001–255100 ==
Named minor planet	Provisional	This minor planet was named for...	Ref · Catalog
255019 Fleurmaxwell	2005 TN_{52}	Fleur Maxwell (born 1988), Luxembourg's 2005 national champion figure skater.	JPL · 255019
255073 Victoriabond	2005 UR_{8}	Victoria Bond, popular Australian science radio presenter of "Diffusion Science Radio"	JPL · 255073

== 255101–255200 ==
back to top

Named minor planet	Provisional	This minor planet was named for...	Ref · Catalog
There are no named minor planets in this number range

== 255201–255300 ==
back to top

Named minor planet	Provisional	This minor planet was named for...	Ref · Catalog
255257 Mechwart	2005 VR_{1}	András Mechwart (1834–1907), a Hungarian industrialist	JPL · 255257
255261 Kubovics	2005 VU_{7}	Imre Kubovics, Hungarian geologist and professor emeritus at Eötvös Loránd University in Budapest.	IAU · 255261

== 255301–255400 ==
back to top

Named minor planet	Provisional	This minor planet was named for...	Ref · Catalog
255308 Christianzuber	2005 WB_{5}	Christian Zuber (1930–2005), a French journalist, writer, film producer and lecturer.	JPL · 255308

== 255401–255500 ==
back to top

Named minor planet	Provisional	This minor planet was named for...	Ref · Catalog
There are no named minor planets in this number range

== 255501–255600 ==
back to top

Named minor planet	Provisional	This minor planet was named for...	Ref · Catalog
255587 Gardenia	2006 OU_{4}	Gardenia, a genus of flowering plants in the coffee family Rubiaceae. The genus was named after Alexander Garden, a Scottish-born American naturalist.	JPL · 255587
255598 Paullauterbur	2006 PE_{1}	Paul Lauterbur (1929–2007), an American chemist and Nobel Laureate	JPL · 255598

== 255601–255700 ==
back to top

Named minor planet	Provisional	This minor planet was named for...	Ref · Catalog
There are no named minor planets in this number range

== 255701–255800 ==
back to top

Named minor planet	Provisional	This minor planet was named for...	Ref · Catalog
255703 Stetson	2006 QN_{90}	Peter B. Stetson (born 1952), a Canadian astronomer and developer of freely-available software for the analysis of CCD images and spectra, who is a co-discoverer of minor planets	JPL · 255703

== 255801–255900 ==
back to top

Named minor planet	Provisional	This minor planet was named for...	Ref · Catalog
There are no named minor planets in this number range

== 255901–256000 ==
back to top

Named minor planet	Provisional	This minor planet was named for...	Ref · Catalog
255940 Maylis	2006 TZ_{9}	Maylis Lavayssière (born 1984), a French research engineer, member of Dax Observatory who has co-authored papers on stellar occultations by asteroids and mutual phenomena of Jupiter's satellites.	IAU · 255940
255989 Dengyushian	2006 TU_{94}	Teng Yu-hsien (1906–1944), a Taiwanese musician, known as the Father of Taiwanese Folk Music. He wrote many famous melodies which are considered to be the symbols of Taiwan's mind and spirit.	JPL · 255989

back to top

Preceded by 254,001–255,000	Meanings of minor-planet names List of minor planets: 255,001–256,000	Succeeded by 256,001–257,000
