= Herman Carr =

American physicist

Herman Y. Carr (November 28, 1924 – April 9, 2008), who published as H. Y. Carr, was an American physicist and pioneer of magnetic resonance imaging (MRI).

== Life ==
Carr was born in Alliance, Ohio, where he was an Alliance High School graduate in January 1943; he later was inducted into their Hall of Fame. He served in the army as a sergeant in the 12th Weather Squadron Air Corps during World War II in Italy.

After the war he received a Harvard National Scholarship from Harvard University and graduated summa cum laude in 1948 and also earned his master's degree in 1949 and a Ph.D. in physics in 1953 from Harvard University. His doctorate thesis, published in 1952, described the first techniques for using gradients in magnetic fields and is the first example of magnetic resonance imaging.

After his PhD, Carr moved to Rutgers University, where he was professor. Carr became professor emeritus in 1987 and was actively involved in the area of MRI with studies up until his death.

Carr, 83, died on April 9, 2008 at his home in Bridgewater Township, New Jersey.

== Honors and awards ==
Carr was known as a fine teacher and received a Guggenheim Fellowship where he participated in a cooperative research program at Cornell University, Oxford University in England and at the University of Amsterdam the Netherlands.

In 2001 an anonymous donation created two Herman Y. Carr Scholarships in Physics and Astronomy at Rutgers University.

== Advocacy ==
As a professed pacifist he served on the National General Board of Church and Society of the United Methodist Church where he was a representative to Russia during glasnost promoting Christianity, justice and world peace. He was recognized and honored in 1995 with the Francis Asbury Award for fostering United Methodist Ministries in Higher Education. He was a very active member of the United Methodist Church of New Brunswick where he served many capacities as a church layman. His special interest was focused on the church's Urban Outreach to area public housing and men's shelters, world peace and social justice.

== Nobel Prize controversy ==
In 2003 the Nobel Prize in Medicine was awarded to Paul C. Lauterbur and Peter Mansfield for their work on MRI. There was some controversy when Carr was not awarded the prize jointly with Lauterbur and Mansfield. See Nobel Prize controversies.

Ten years before the Nobel announcement, Carr wrote to Physics Today noting that both his 1952 demonstration of use of magnetic gradients for spatial localization and his actual demonstration of 1-D "imaging" had been overlooked by the radiologist Felix Wehrli in a 1992 article. In a later letter to Physics Today, Carr noted that the 1952 MRI demonstration had also been overlooked by Bertram Schwarzschild in a 2003 article which referred to Wehrli's 1992 article. Schwarzschild did mention the 1952 use of field gradients to correlate nuclear signals to spatial location and thus enable the measurements of both diffusion and flow, but the 1952 MRI measurement of structure was not mentioned.

== Books ==
In addition to numerous scientific publications Carr co-authored the introductory textbook Physics From the Ground Up published in 1971.
