= List of minor planets: 255001–256000 =

The following is a partial list of minor planets, running from minor-planet number 255001 through 256000, inclusive. The primary data for this and other partial lists is based on JPL's "Small-Body Orbital Elements" and data available from the Minor Planet Center. Critical list information is also provided by the MPC, unless otherwise specified from Lowell Observatory. A detailed description of the table's columns and additional sources are given on the main page including a complete list of every page in this series, and a statistical break-up on the dynamical classification of minor planets.

Also see the summary list of all named bodies in numerical and alphabetical order, and the corresponding naming citations for the number range of this particular list. New namings may only be added to this list after official publication, as the preannouncement of names is condemned by the Working Group for Small Bodies Nomenclature of the International Astronomical Union.

Near-Earth obj.	MBA (inner)	MBA (outer)	Centaur
Mars-crosser	MBA (middle)	Jupiter trojan	Trans-Neptunian obj.
Unclassified

== 255001–255100 ==
Designation			Discovery			Properties		Ref
Permanent	Provisional	Named after	Date	Site	Discoverer(s)	Category	Diam.	Ref
255001	2005 TX_{12}	—	October 2, 2005	Mount Lemmon	Mount Lemmon Survey	·	1.9 km	MPC · JPL
255002	2005 TT_{13}	—	October 3, 2005	Palomar	NEAT	·	4.3 km	MPC · JPL
255003	2005 TD_{17}	—	October 1, 2005	Socorro	LINEAR	·	2.4 km	MPC · JPL
255004	2005 TT_{18}	—	October 1, 2005	Catalina	CSS	·	2.6 km	MPC · JPL
255005	2005 TU_{20}	—	October 1, 2005	Mount Lemmon	Mount Lemmon Survey	·	1.9 km	MPC · JPL
255006	2005 TV_{21}	—	October 1, 2005	Kitt Peak	Spacewatch	AST	2.5 km	MPC · JPL
255007	2005 TB_{25}	—	October 1, 2005	Mount Lemmon	Mount Lemmon Survey	·	3.2 km	MPC · JPL
255008	2005 TH_{25}	—	October 1, 2005	Mount Lemmon	Mount Lemmon Survey	(43176) ·	4.8 km	MPC · JPL
255009	2005 TV_{25}	—	October 1, 2005	Mount Lemmon	Mount Lemmon Survey	fast	3.5 km	MPC · JPL
255010	2005 TM_{28}	—	October 1, 2005	Mount Lemmon	Mount Lemmon Survey	·	4.3 km	MPC · JPL
255011	2005 TU_{28}	—	October 2, 2005	Palomar	NEAT	·	2.5 km	MPC · JPL
255012	2005 TT_{36}	—	October 1, 2005	Socorro	LINEAR	·	2.4 km	MPC · JPL
255013	2005 TN_{40}	—	October 1, 2005	Kitt Peak	Spacewatch	·	2.3 km	MPC · JPL
255014	2005 TD_{41}	—	October 2, 2005	Mount Lemmon	Mount Lemmon Survey	·	2.3 km	MPC · JPL
255015	2005 TF_{42}	—	October 3, 2005	Catalina	CSS	EOS	3.4 km	MPC · JPL
255016	2005 TX_{46}	—	October 3, 2005	Catalina	CSS	HOF	3.9 km	MPC · JPL
255017	2005 TB_{48}	—	October 6, 2005	Kitt Peak	Spacewatch	·	2.8 km	MPC · JPL
255018	2005 TK_{48}	—	October 7, 2005	Junk Bond	D. Healy	EOS	3.0 km	MPC · JPL
255019 Fleurmaxwell	2005 TN_{52}	Fleurmaxwell	October 10, 2005	Cote de Meuse	Dawson, M.	THM	2.3 km	MPC · JPL
255020	2005 TB_{54}	—	October 1, 2005	Kitt Peak	Spacewatch	·	2.9 km	MPC · JPL
255021	2005 TS_{54}	—	October 1, 2005	Anderson Mesa	LONEOS	·	3.1 km	MPC · JPL
255022	2005 TJ_{55}	—	October 5, 2005	Socorro	LINEAR	·	2.4 km	MPC · JPL
255023	2005 TT_{55}	—	October 6, 2005	Kitt Peak	Spacewatch	KOR	2.0 km	MPC · JPL
255024	2005 TY_{61}	—	October 4, 2005	Mount Lemmon	Mount Lemmon Survey	·	3.2 km	MPC · JPL
255025	2005 TK_{62}	—	October 4, 2005	Mount Lemmon	Mount Lemmon Survey	·	2.4 km	MPC · JPL
255026	2005 TV_{63}	—	October 6, 2005	Catalina	CSS	·	2.9 km	MPC · JPL
255027	2005 TQ_{64}	—	October 7, 2005	Kitt Peak	Spacewatch	HYG	5.2 km	MPC · JPL
255028	2005 TY_{70}	—	October 6, 2005	Mount Lemmon	Mount Lemmon Survey	AGN	1.7 km	MPC · JPL
255029	2005 TQ_{72}	—	October 5, 2005	Catalina	CSS	·	2.9 km	MPC · JPL
255030	2005 TJ_{74}	—	October 7, 2005	Anderson Mesa	LONEOS	·	3.9 km	MPC · JPL
255031	2005 TE_{75}	—	October 2, 2005	Palomar	NEAT	·	3.0 km	MPC · JPL
255032	2005 TJ_{78}	—	October 7, 2005	Catalina	CSS	KOR	2.0 km	MPC · JPL
255033	2005 TX_{84}	—	October 3, 2005	Kitt Peak	Spacewatch	(13314)	2.7 km	MPC · JPL
255034	2005 TJ_{86}	—	October 4, 2005	Catalina	CSS	H	530 m	MPC · JPL
255035	2005 TJ_{89}	—	October 5, 2005	Mount Lemmon	Mount Lemmon Survey	KOR	1.4 km	MPC · JPL
255036	2005 TJ_{99}	—	October 7, 2005	Catalina	CSS	·	4.2 km	MPC · JPL
255037	2005 TL_{99}	—	October 7, 2005	Kitt Peak	Spacewatch	AGN	1.2 km	MPC · JPL
255038	2005 TZ_{100}	—	October 7, 2005	Catalina	CSS	·	2.3 km	MPC · JPL
255039	2005 TP_{102}	—	October 7, 2005	Mount Lemmon	Mount Lemmon Survey	·	2.6 km	MPC · JPL
255040	2005 TY_{104}	—	October 8, 2005	Socorro	LINEAR	·	3.6 km	MPC · JPL
255041	2005 TU_{105}	—	October 9, 2005	Kitt Peak	Spacewatch	H	670 m	MPC · JPL
255042	2005 TD_{114}	—	October 7, 2005	Kitt Peak	Spacewatch	KOR	1.4 km	MPC · JPL
255043	2005 TT_{116}	—	October 7, 2005	Kitt Peak	Spacewatch	AGN	970 m	MPC · JPL
255044	2005 TW_{121}	—	October 7, 2005	Kitt Peak	Spacewatch	·	2.4 km	MPC · JPL
255045	2005 TT_{125}	—	October 7, 2005	Kitt Peak	Spacewatch	AST	2.0 km	MPC · JPL
255046	2005 TY_{126}	—	October 7, 2005	Kitt Peak	Spacewatch	·	2.1 km	MPC · JPL
255047	2005 TT_{128}	—	October 7, 2005	Kitt Peak	Spacewatch	·	3.8 km	MPC · JPL
255048	2005 TQ_{131}	—	October 7, 2005	Kitt Peak	Spacewatch	·	3.0 km	MPC · JPL
255049	2005 TO_{137}	—	October 6, 2005	Kitt Peak	Spacewatch	NAE	3.3 km	MPC · JPL
255050	2005 TS_{137}	—	October 6, 2005	Kitt Peak	Spacewatch	KOR	1.7 km	MPC · JPL
255051	2005 TM_{139}	—	October 8, 2005	Kitt Peak	Spacewatch	KOR	1.6 km	MPC · JPL
255052	2005 TS_{139}	—	October 8, 2005	Kitt Peak	Spacewatch	KOR	1.8 km	MPC · JPL
255053	2005 TE_{141}	—	October 8, 2005	Kitt Peak	Spacewatch	·	3.3 km	MPC · JPL
255054	2005 TZ_{142}	—	October 8, 2005	Kitt Peak	Spacewatch	AGN	1.6 km	MPC · JPL
255055	2005 TY_{150}	—	October 8, 2005	Kitt Peak	Spacewatch	KOR	2.0 km	MPC · JPL
255056	2005 TT_{152}	—	October 11, 2005	Kitt Peak	Spacewatch	THB	4.0 km	MPC · JPL
255057	2005 TJ_{155}	—	October 9, 2005	Kitt Peak	Spacewatch	·	2.0 km	MPC · JPL
255058	2005 TR_{160}	—	October 9, 2005	Kitt Peak	Spacewatch	·	2.9 km	MPC · JPL
255059	2005 TG_{161}	—	October 9, 2005	Kitt Peak	Spacewatch	·	3.5 km	MPC · JPL
255060	2005 TG_{167}	—	October 9, 2005	Kitt Peak	Spacewatch	·	2.4 km	MPC · JPL
255061	2005 TX_{167}	—	October 9, 2005	Kitt Peak	Spacewatch	·	2.0 km	MPC · JPL
255062	2005 TS_{170}	—	October 12, 2005	Kitt Peak	Spacewatch	HOF	3.2 km	MPC · JPL
255063	2005 TX_{174}	—	October 1, 2005	Anderson Mesa	LONEOS	·	2.8 km	MPC · JPL
255064	2005 TC_{178}	—	October 1, 2005	Kitt Peak	Spacewatch	KOR	1.8 km	MPC · JPL
255065	2005 TX_{181}	—	October 2, 2005	Palomar	NEAT	EOS	2.6 km	MPC · JPL
255066	2005 TQ_{182}	—	October 5, 2005	Catalina	CSS	·	4.3 km	MPC · JPL
255067	2005 TD_{191}	—	October 1, 2005	Socorro	LINEAR	·	4.9 km	MPC · JPL
255068	2005 UO_{1}	—	October 21, 2005	Pla D'Arguines	D'Arguines, Pla	·	2.1 km	MPC · JPL
255069	2005 UP_{1}	—	October 22, 2005	Junk Bond	D. Healy	·	2.3 km	MPC · JPL
255070	2005 UP_{3}	—	October 26, 2005	Cordell-Lorenz	Cordell-Lorenz	·	2.3 km	MPC · JPL
255071	2005 UH_{6}	—	October 28, 2005	Mount Lemmon	Mount Lemmon Survey	APO · PHA	760 m	MPC · JPL
255072	2005 UP_{8}	—	October 27, 2005	Ottmarsheim	C. Rinner	·	3.4 km	MPC · JPL
255073 Victoriabond	2005 UR_{8}	Victoriabond	October 30, 2005	Cote de Meuse	Dawson, M.	KOR	1.7 km	MPC · JPL
255074	2005 UZ_{17}	—	October 22, 2005	Catalina	CSS	·	1.5 km	MPC · JPL
255075	2005 UN_{18}	—	October 22, 2005	Kitt Peak	Spacewatch	·	3.6 km	MPC · JPL
255076	2005 UP_{18}	—	October 22, 2005	Kitt Peak	Spacewatch	·	2.6 km	MPC · JPL
255077	2005 UU_{18}	—	October 22, 2005	Kitt Peak	Spacewatch	EOS	2.5 km	MPC · JPL
255078	2005 UU_{21}	—	October 23, 2005	Kitt Peak	Spacewatch	·	1.9 km	MPC · JPL
255079	2005 UF_{30}	—	October 23, 2005	Catalina	CSS	·	3.5 km	MPC · JPL
255080	2005 UQ_{35}	—	October 24, 2005	Kitt Peak	Spacewatch	·	1.7 km	MPC · JPL
255081	2005 UG_{36}	—	October 24, 2005	Kitt Peak	Spacewatch	·	3.4 km	MPC · JPL
255082	2005 UD_{39}	—	October 24, 2005	Kitt Peak	Spacewatch	·	4.7 km	MPC · JPL
255083	2005 UG_{39}	—	October 24, 2005	Kitt Peak	Spacewatch	THM	2.6 km	MPC · JPL
255084	2005 UT_{39}	—	October 24, 2005	Kitt Peak	Spacewatch	·	2.7 km	MPC · JPL
255085	2005 UJ_{40}	—	October 24, 2005	Kitt Peak	Spacewatch	·	3.8 km	MPC · JPL
255086	2005 UL_{40}	—	October 24, 2005	Kitt Peak	Spacewatch	·	2.7 km	MPC · JPL
255087	2005 UY_{40}	—	October 24, 2005	Kitt Peak	Spacewatch	·	4.2 km	MPC · JPL
255088	2005 UV_{41}	—	October 24, 2005	Goodricke-Pigott	R. A. Tucker	·	3.1 km	MPC · JPL
255089	2005 UU_{42}	—	October 22, 2005	Kitt Peak	Spacewatch	·	2.5 km	MPC · JPL
255090	2005 UV_{42}	—	October 22, 2005	Kitt Peak	Spacewatch	·	2.7 km	MPC · JPL
255091	2005 UU_{44}	—	October 22, 2005	Kitt Peak	Spacewatch	·	2.1 km	MPC · JPL
255092	2005 UP_{47}	—	October 22, 2005	Catalina	CSS	H	530 m	MPC · JPL
255093	2005 UW_{48}	—	October 23, 2005	Kitt Peak	Spacewatch	EOS	2.8 km	MPC · JPL
255094	2005 UM_{49}	—	October 23, 2005	Catalina	CSS	EMA	3.9 km	MPC · JPL
255095	2005 UN_{50}	—	October 23, 2005	Catalina	CSS	·	3.1 km	MPC · JPL
255096	2005 UY_{57}	—	October 24, 2005	Kitt Peak	Spacewatch	EOS	2.7 km	MPC · JPL
255097	2005 UH_{61}	—	October 25, 2005	Catalina	CSS	·	4.0 km	MPC · JPL
255098	2005 UP_{62}	—	October 25, 2005	Mount Lemmon	Mount Lemmon Survey	·	3.5 km	MPC · JPL
255099	2005 UK_{63}	—	October 25, 2005	Mount Lemmon	Mount Lemmon Survey	·	2.7 km	MPC · JPL
255100	2005 UQ_{65}	—	October 22, 2005	Palomar	NEAT	HNS	2.2 km	MPC · JPL

== 255101–255200 ==
back to top

Designation			Discovery			Properties		Ref
Permanent	Provisional	Named after	Date	Site	Discoverer(s)	Category	Diam.	Ref
255101	2005 UB_{66}	—	October 22, 2005	Catalina	CSS	·	4.5 km	MPC · JPL
255102	2005 UC_{67}	—	October 22, 2005	Catalina	CSS	·	2.7 km	MPC · JPL
255103	2005 US_{67}	—	October 22, 2005	Palomar	NEAT	·	4.0 km	MPC · JPL
255104	2005 UJ_{68}	—	October 22, 2005	Palomar	NEAT	·	2.7 km	MPC · JPL
255105	2005 UB_{70}	—	October 23, 2005	Catalina	CSS	·	3.2 km	MPC · JPL
255106	2005 UW_{70}	—	October 23, 2005	Catalina	CSS	(31811)	4.2 km	MPC · JPL
255107	2005 UH_{73}	—	October 23, 2005	Palomar	NEAT	EOS	2.9 km	MPC · JPL
255108	2005 UD_{87}	—	October 22, 2005	Kitt Peak	Spacewatch	KOR	1.6 km	MPC · JPL
255109	2005 UU_{88}	—	October 22, 2005	Kitt Peak	Spacewatch	KOR	1.7 km	MPC · JPL
255110	2005 UH_{90}	—	October 22, 2005	Kitt Peak	Spacewatch	(1298)	4.2 km	MPC · JPL
255111	2005 UB_{93}	—	October 22, 2005	Kitt Peak	Spacewatch	·	3.1 km	MPC · JPL
255112	2005 UQ_{98}	—	October 22, 2005	Kitt Peak	Spacewatch	·	2.4 km	MPC · JPL
255113	2005 UK_{99}	—	October 22, 2005	Kitt Peak	Spacewatch	·	2.6 km	MPC · JPL
255114	2005 UD_{101}	—	October 22, 2005	Kitt Peak	Spacewatch	EOS	2.6 km	MPC · JPL
255115	2005 UP_{102}	—	October 22, 2005	Kitt Peak	Spacewatch	·	1.7 km	MPC · JPL
255116	2005 UJ_{104}	—	October 22, 2005	Kitt Peak	Spacewatch	·	3.0 km	MPC · JPL
255117	2005 UJ_{106}	—	October 22, 2005	Catalina	CSS	·	3.5 km	MPC · JPL
255118	2005 UX_{106}	—	October 22, 2005	Kitt Peak	Spacewatch	KOR	1.8 km	MPC · JPL
255119	2005 UZ_{108}	—	October 22, 2005	Palomar	NEAT	·	2.5 km	MPC · JPL
255120	2005 UF_{110}	—	October 22, 2005	Kitt Peak	Spacewatch	·	2.3 km	MPC · JPL
255121	2005 UW_{113}	—	October 22, 2005	Kitt Peak	Spacewatch	THM	2.8 km	MPC · JPL
255122	2005 UB_{114}	—	October 22, 2005	Kitt Peak	Spacewatch	·	2.3 km	MPC · JPL
255123	2005 UR_{115}	—	October 23, 2005	Palomar	NEAT	HYG	4.0 km	MPC · JPL
255124	2005 UU_{119}	—	October 24, 2005	Kitt Peak	Spacewatch	LIX	5.0 km	MPC · JPL
255125	2005 UH_{120}	—	October 24, 2005	Kitt Peak	Spacewatch	KOR	1.7 km	MPC · JPL
255126	2005 UL_{126}	—	October 24, 2005	Kitt Peak	Spacewatch	KOR	2.0 km	MPC · JPL
255127	2005 UE_{128}	—	October 24, 2005	Kitt Peak	Spacewatch	·	3.7 km	MPC · JPL
255128	2005 US_{128}	—	October 24, 2005	Kitt Peak	Spacewatch	·	3.4 km	MPC · JPL
255129	2005 UC_{130}	—	October 24, 2005	Palomar	NEAT	·	1.7 km	MPC · JPL
255130	2005 UG_{130}	—	October 24, 2005	Palomar	NEAT	·	2.5 km	MPC · JPL
255131	2005 UJ_{130}	—	October 24, 2005	Palomar	NEAT	·	2.9 km	MPC · JPL
255132	2005 UE_{131}	—	October 24, 2005	Kitt Peak	Spacewatch	·	6.3 km	MPC · JPL
255133	2005 UO_{132}	—	October 24, 2005	Palomar	NEAT	EOS	2.6 km	MPC · JPL
255134	2005 UY_{136}	—	October 25, 2005	Mount Lemmon	Mount Lemmon Survey	·	3.5 km	MPC · JPL
255135	2005 UR_{138}	—	October 25, 2005	Kitt Peak	Spacewatch	·	5.6 km	MPC · JPL
255136	2005 UE_{141}	—	October 25, 2005	Catalina	CSS	·	2.9 km	MPC · JPL
255137	2005 UX_{141}	—	October 25, 2005	Catalina	CSS	615	2.3 km	MPC · JPL
255138	2005 UY_{141}	—	October 25, 2005	Catalina	CSS	EOS	3.5 km	MPC · JPL
255139	2005 UP_{142}	—	October 25, 2005	Mount Lemmon	Mount Lemmon Survey	KOR	1.9 km	MPC · JPL
255140	2005 UT_{146}	—	October 26, 2005	Kitt Peak	Spacewatch	·	2.9 km	MPC · JPL
255141	2005 UE_{148}	—	October 26, 2005	Kitt Peak	Spacewatch	·	2.4 km	MPC · JPL
255142	2005 US_{150}	—	October 26, 2005	Anderson Mesa	LONEOS	·	3.3 km	MPC · JPL
255143	2005 UV_{153}	—	October 26, 2005	Kitt Peak	Spacewatch	KOR	2.0 km	MPC · JPL
255144	2005 UD_{155}	—	October 26, 2005	Kitt Peak	Spacewatch	·	2.7 km	MPC · JPL
255145	2005 UY_{161}	—	October 25, 2005	Catalina	CSS	·	4.0 km	MPC · JPL
255146	2005 UD_{165}	—	October 24, 2005	Kitt Peak	Spacewatch	·	2.7 km	MPC · JPL
255147	2005 UX_{166}	—	October 24, 2005	Kitt Peak	Spacewatch	·	2.2 km	MPC · JPL
255148	2005 UM_{167}	—	October 24, 2005	Kitt Peak	Spacewatch	·	2.9 km	MPC · JPL
255149	2005 UA_{170}	—	October 24, 2005	Kitt Peak	Spacewatch	EOS	2.7 km	MPC · JPL
255150	2005 US_{171}	—	October 24, 2005	Kitt Peak	Spacewatch	·	2.3 km	MPC · JPL
255151	2005 UF_{174}	—	October 24, 2005	Kitt Peak	Spacewatch	·	3.2 km	MPC · JPL
255152	2005 UQ_{176}	—	October 24, 2005	Kitt Peak	Spacewatch	·	2.4 km	MPC · JPL
255153	2005 UY_{177}	—	October 24, 2005	Kitt Peak	Spacewatch	·	2.7 km	MPC · JPL
255154	2005 UL_{179}	—	October 24, 2005	Kitt Peak	Spacewatch	THM	2.6 km	MPC · JPL
255155	2005 UD_{181}	—	October 24, 2005	Kitt Peak	Spacewatch	KOR	1.7 km	MPC · JPL
255156	2005 UF_{181}	—	October 24, 2005	Kitt Peak	Spacewatch	·	2.6 km	MPC · JPL
255157	2005 UN_{183}	—	October 25, 2005	Mount Lemmon	Mount Lemmon Survey	·	2.4 km	MPC · JPL
255158	2005 UU_{183}	—	October 25, 2005	Mount Lemmon	Mount Lemmon Survey	·	2.9 km	MPC · JPL
255159	2005 UV_{183}	—	October 25, 2005	Mount Lemmon	Mount Lemmon Survey	·	2.0 km	MPC · JPL
255160	2005 UO_{184}	—	October 25, 2005	Mount Lemmon	Mount Lemmon Survey	·	2.9 km	MPC · JPL
255161	2005 UG_{190}	—	October 27, 2005	Mount Lemmon	Mount Lemmon Survey	·	3.4 km	MPC · JPL
255162	2005 UL_{190}	—	October 27, 2005	Mount Lemmon	Mount Lemmon Survey	THM	2.6 km	MPC · JPL
255163	2005 UT_{192}	—	October 22, 2005	Kitt Peak	Spacewatch	·	2.5 km	MPC · JPL
255164	2005 UP_{196}	—	October 24, 2005	Kitt Peak	Spacewatch	·	2.6 km	MPC · JPL
255165	2005 UT_{198}	—	October 25, 2005	Kitt Peak	Spacewatch	KOR	1.6 km	MPC · JPL
255166	2005 US_{199}	—	October 25, 2005	Kitt Peak	Spacewatch	THM	2.7 km	MPC · JPL
255167	2005 UF_{201}	—	October 25, 2005	Kitt Peak	Spacewatch	EOS	2.9 km	MPC · JPL
255168	2005 US_{205}	—	October 26, 2005	Kitt Peak	Spacewatch	·	3.6 km	MPC · JPL
255169	2005 UC_{210}	—	October 27, 2005	Kitt Peak	Spacewatch	·	4.5 km	MPC · JPL
255170	2005 UN_{217}	—	October 28, 2005	Socorro	LINEAR	·	2.6 km	MPC · JPL
255171	2005 UQ_{217}	—	October 22, 2005	Kitt Peak	Spacewatch	HYG	3.2 km	MPC · JPL
255172	2005 UO_{221}	—	October 25, 2005	Kitt Peak	Spacewatch	·	4.0 km	MPC · JPL
255173	2005 UE_{222}	—	October 25, 2005	Kitt Peak	Spacewatch	·	2.9 km	MPC · JPL
255174	2005 UL_{226}	—	October 25, 2005	Kitt Peak	Spacewatch	EOS	2.6 km	MPC · JPL
255175	2005 UU_{230}	—	October 25, 2005	Mount Lemmon	Mount Lemmon Survey	THM	2.5 km	MPC · JPL
255176	2005 UL_{236}	—	October 25, 2005	Kitt Peak	Spacewatch	EOS	2.1 km	MPC · JPL
255177	2005 UA_{239}	—	October 25, 2005	Kitt Peak	Spacewatch	·	6.1 km	MPC · JPL
255178	2005 UJ_{241}	—	October 25, 2005	Catalina	CSS	EOS	2.6 km	MPC · JPL
255179	2005 UD_{242}	—	October 25, 2005	Kitt Peak	Spacewatch	·	4.8 km	MPC · JPL
255180	2005 UT_{246}	—	October 27, 2005	Mount Lemmon	Mount Lemmon Survey	·	2.1 km	MPC · JPL
255181	2005 UG_{248}	—	October 28, 2005	Mount Lemmon	Mount Lemmon Survey	·	2.8 km	MPC · JPL
255182	2005 UE_{255}	—	October 24, 2005	Kitt Peak	Spacewatch	·	2.3 km	MPC · JPL
255183	2005 UJ_{256}	—	October 25, 2005	Kitt Peak	Spacewatch	·	1.8 km	MPC · JPL
255184	2005 UR_{256}	—	October 25, 2005	Kitt Peak	Spacewatch	·	2.1 km	MPC · JPL
255185	2005 UH_{258}	—	October 25, 2005	Kitt Peak	Spacewatch	·	2.2 km	MPC · JPL
255186	2005 UG_{265}	—	October 27, 2005	Kitt Peak	Spacewatch	THM	2.5 km	MPC · JPL
255187	2005 UC_{279}	—	October 24, 2005	Kitt Peak	Spacewatch	·	2.9 km	MPC · JPL
255188	2005 UK_{282}	—	October 26, 2005	Kitt Peak	Spacewatch	EOS	1.9 km	MPC · JPL
255189	2005 UV_{284}	—	October 26, 2005	Kitt Peak	Spacewatch	·	3.6 km	MPC · JPL
255190	2005 UU_{287}	—	October 26, 2005	Kitt Peak	Spacewatch	THM	3.0 km	MPC · JPL
255191	2005 UF_{294}	—	October 26, 2005	Kitt Peak	Spacewatch	·	3.1 km	MPC · JPL
255192	2005 UY_{299}	—	October 26, 2005	Kitt Peak	Spacewatch	·	3.9 km	MPC · JPL
255193	2005 UA_{304}	—	October 26, 2005	Kitt Peak	Spacewatch	EOS	2.5 km	MPC · JPL
255194	2005 UH_{308}	—	October 27, 2005	Mount Lemmon	Mount Lemmon Survey	·	3.3 km	MPC · JPL
255195	2005 UB_{313}	—	October 29, 2005	Catalina	CSS	·	2.9 km	MPC · JPL
255196	2005 UH_{313}	—	October 29, 2005	Catalina	CSS	EOS	2.3 km	MPC · JPL
255197	2005 UA_{314}	—	October 27, 2005	Catalina	CSS	·	4.4 km	MPC · JPL
255198	2005 UX_{314}	—	October 24, 2005	Kitt Peak	Spacewatch	·	3.1 km	MPC · JPL
255199	2005 UD_{319}	—	October 27, 2005	Kitt Peak	Spacewatch	·	3.8 km	MPC · JPL
255200	2005 UE_{320}	—	October 27, 2005	Kitt Peak	Spacewatch	EOS	2.3 km	MPC · JPL

== 255201–255300 ==
back to top

Designation			Discovery			Properties		Ref
Permanent	Provisional	Named after	Date	Site	Discoverer(s)	Category	Diam.	Ref
255201	2005 UY_{321}	—	October 27, 2005	Kitt Peak	Spacewatch	EOS	2.9 km	MPC · JPL
255202	2005 UU_{327}	—	October 29, 2005	Catalina	CSS	EOS	2.9 km	MPC · JPL
255203	2005 UJ_{329}	—	October 28, 2005	Mount Lemmon	Mount Lemmon Survey	KOR	1.5 km	MPC · JPL
255204	2005 UM_{330}	—	October 28, 2005	Mount Lemmon	Mount Lemmon Survey	EOS	2.6 km	MPC · JPL
255205	2005 UU_{337}	—	October 31, 2005	Kitt Peak	Spacewatch	·	3.5 km	MPC · JPL
255206	2005 UD_{338}	—	October 31, 2005	Kitt Peak	Spacewatch	EOS	1.9 km	MPC · JPL
255207	2005 UG_{341}	—	October 31, 2005	Socorro	LINEAR	·	3.6 km	MPC · JPL
255208	2005 UN_{343}	—	October 31, 2005	Catalina	CSS	·	4.6 km	MPC · JPL
255209	2005 UC_{349}	—	October 25, 2005	Kitt Peak	Spacewatch	·	3.3 km	MPC · JPL
255210	2005 UH_{351}	—	October 29, 2005	Catalina	CSS	·	3.1 km	MPC · JPL
255211	2005 UN_{351}	—	October 29, 2005	Catalina	CSS	·	3.2 km	MPC · JPL
255212	2005 UL_{353}	—	October 29, 2005	Catalina	CSS	·	3.1 km	MPC · JPL
255213	2005 UW_{353}	—	October 29, 2005	Catalina	CSS	·	4.8 km	MPC · JPL
255214	2005 UQ_{354}	—	October 29, 2005	Catalina	CSS	·	3.5 km	MPC · JPL
255215	2005 UG_{355}	—	October 29, 2005	Catalina	CSS	EOS	2.5 km	MPC · JPL
255216	2005 UQ_{357}	—	October 30, 2005	Catalina	CSS	·	2.7 km	MPC · JPL
255217	2005 UX_{359}	—	October 25, 2005	Mount Lemmon	Mount Lemmon Survey	AGN	1.6 km	MPC · JPL
255218	2005 UR_{378}	—	October 29, 2005	Mount Lemmon	Mount Lemmon Survey	·	2.5 km	MPC · JPL
255219	2005 UZ_{384}	—	October 27, 2005	Kitt Peak	Spacewatch	·	3.5 km	MPC · JPL
255220	2005 UY_{391}	—	October 30, 2005	Kitt Peak	Spacewatch	·	1.8 km	MPC · JPL
255221	2005 UU_{392}	—	October 30, 2005	Mount Lemmon	Mount Lemmon Survey	KOR	1.4 km	MPC · JPL
255222	2005 UW_{397}	—	October 29, 2005	Catalina	CSS	·	2.2 km	MPC · JPL
255223	2005 UQ_{398}	—	October 30, 2005	Socorro	LINEAR	·	4.0 km	MPC · JPL
255224	2005 UD_{399}	—	October 30, 2005	Mount Lemmon	Mount Lemmon Survey	EOS ·	5.4 km	MPC · JPL
255225	2005 UM_{408}	—	October 31, 2005	Mount Lemmon	Mount Lemmon Survey	·	3.1 km	MPC · JPL
255226	2005 UU_{411}	—	October 31, 2005	Mount Lemmon	Mount Lemmon Survey	·	4.1 km	MPC · JPL
255227	2005 UO_{420}	—	October 25, 2005	Mount Lemmon	Mount Lemmon Survey	·	4.1 km	MPC · JPL
255228	2005 UH_{422}	—	October 27, 2005	Mount Lemmon	Mount Lemmon Survey	·	2.9 km	MPC · JPL
255229	2005 UY_{424}	—	October 28, 2005	Kitt Peak	Spacewatch	·	2.0 km	MPC · JPL
255230	2005 UZ_{432}	—	October 28, 2005	Kitt Peak	Spacewatch	EOS	4.1 km	MPC · JPL
255231	2005 UD_{438}	—	October 27, 2005	Kitt Peak	Spacewatch	·	3.1 km	MPC · JPL
255232	2005 UF_{438}	—	October 27, 2005	Mount Lemmon	Mount Lemmon Survey	·	3.7 km	MPC · JPL
255233	2005 UT_{438}	—	October 28, 2005	Mount Lemmon	Mount Lemmon Survey	AGN	1.4 km	MPC · JPL
255234	2005 UO_{439}	—	October 29, 2005	Catalina	CSS	·	2.4 km	MPC · JPL
255235	2005 UH_{440}	—	October 29, 2005	Catalina	CSS	EOS	2.2 km	MPC · JPL
255236	2005 UK_{440}	—	October 29, 2005	Catalina	CSS	·	3.1 km	MPC · JPL
255237	2005 UF_{443}	—	October 30, 2005	Socorro	LINEAR	·	3.2 km	MPC · JPL
255238	2005 UZ_{444}	—	October 31, 2005	Kitt Peak	Spacewatch	·	2.7 km	MPC · JPL
255239	2005 UM_{446}	—	October 29, 2005	Catalina	CSS	·	2.9 km	MPC · JPL
255240	2005 UM_{447}	—	October 29, 2005	Catalina	CSS	·	4.8 km	MPC · JPL
255241	2005 UP_{459}	—	October 27, 2005	Mount Lemmon	Mount Lemmon Survey	·	2.1 km	MPC · JPL
255242	2005 UW_{460}	—	October 28, 2005	Mount Lemmon	Mount Lemmon Survey	·	3.3 km	MPC · JPL
255243	2005 UD_{482}	—	October 22, 2005	Catalina	CSS	VER	4.5 km	MPC · JPL
255244	2005 UC_{485}	—	October 22, 2005	Catalina	CSS	TIR	3.8 km	MPC · JPL
255245	2005 UJ_{495}	—	October 26, 2005	Anderson Mesa	LONEOS	·	4.1 km	MPC · JPL
255246	2005 UE_{497}	—	October 27, 2005	Socorro	LINEAR	·	2.6 km	MPC · JPL
255247	2005 UB_{500}	—	October 27, 2005	Anderson Mesa	LONEOS	EOS	3.4 km	MPC · JPL
255248	2005 UR_{508}	—	October 22, 2005	Kitt Peak	Spacewatch	·	2.4 km	MPC · JPL
255249	2005 UZ_{508}	—	October 25, 2005	Mount Lemmon	Mount Lemmon Survey	CYB	4.4 km	MPC · JPL
255250	2005 UP_{510}	—	October 25, 2005	Mount Lemmon	Mount Lemmon Survey	KOR	1.6 km	MPC · JPL
255251	2005 UR_{511}	—	October 28, 2005	Kitt Peak	Spacewatch	·	1.9 km	MPC · JPL
255252	2005 UA_{514}	—	October 28, 2005	Mount Lemmon	Mount Lemmon Survey	·	2.7 km	MPC · JPL
255253	2005 US_{519}	—	October 26, 2005	Apache Point	A. C. Becker	TEL	1.9 km	MPC · JPL
255254	2005 US_{523}	—	October 27, 2005	Apache Point	A. C. Becker	AGN	1.6 km	MPC · JPL
255255	2005 UP_{524}	—	October 24, 2005	Kitt Peak	Spacewatch	·	3.1 km	MPC · JPL
255256	2005 VL	—	November 2, 2005	Socorro	LINEAR	H	520 m	MPC · JPL
255257 Mechwart	2005 VR_{1}	Mechwart	November 4, 2005	Piszkéstető	K. Sárneczky	·	3.4 km	MPC · JPL
255258	2005 VH_{4}	—	November 6, 2005	Mayhill	Lowe, A.	·	3.4 km	MPC · JPL
255259	2005 VQ_{6}	—	November 6, 2005	Kitt Peak	Spacewatch	·	3.9 km	MPC · JPL
255260	2005 VV_{6}	—	November 6, 2005	Mount Lemmon	Mount Lemmon Survey	·	3.6 km	MPC · JPL
255261 Kubovics	2005 VU_{7}	Kubovics	November 9, 2005	Piszkéstető	K. Sárneczky	·	2.9 km	MPC · JPL
255262	2005 VH_{25}	—	November 2, 2005	Socorro	LINEAR	·	3.5 km	MPC · JPL
255263	2005 VG_{26}	—	November 3, 2005	Kitt Peak	Spacewatch	AGN	1.6 km	MPC · JPL
255264	2005 VG_{32}	—	November 4, 2005	Kitt Peak	Spacewatch	·	2.0 km	MPC · JPL
255265	2005 VH_{41}	—	November 4, 2005	Mount Lemmon	Mount Lemmon Survey	·	2.7 km	MPC · JPL
255266	2005 VH_{42}	—	November 3, 2005	Catalina	CSS	·	2.8 km	MPC · JPL
255267	2005 VE_{48}	—	November 5, 2005	Kitt Peak	Spacewatch	EOS	1.9 km	MPC · JPL
255268	2005 VH_{49}	—	November 1, 2005	Socorro	LINEAR	·	4.5 km	MPC · JPL
255269	2005 VK_{49}	—	November 1, 2005	Kitt Peak	Spacewatch	EOS	3.2 km	MPC · JPL
255270	2005 VV_{49}	—	November 2, 2005	Socorro	LINEAR	·	6.0 km	MPC · JPL
255271	2005 VS_{50}	—	November 3, 2005	Catalina	CSS	·	2.4 km	MPC · JPL
255272	2005 VT_{52}	—	November 3, 2005	Mount Lemmon	Mount Lemmon Survey	·	3.7 km	MPC · JPL
255273	2005 VV_{52}	—	November 3, 2005	Mount Lemmon	Mount Lemmon Survey	EOS	2.8 km	MPC · JPL
255274	2005 VJ_{53}	—	November 3, 2005	Mount Lemmon	Mount Lemmon Survey	·	5.6 km	MPC · JPL
255275	2005 VD_{58}	—	November 4, 2005	Mount Lemmon	Mount Lemmon Survey	URS	4.7 km	MPC · JPL
255276	2005 VE_{59}	—	November 5, 2005	Mount Lemmon	Mount Lemmon Survey	·	2.1 km	MPC · JPL
255277	2005 VZ_{60}	—	November 5, 2005	Catalina	CSS	·	3.3 km	MPC · JPL
255278	2005 VU_{62}	—	November 1, 2005	Mount Lemmon	Mount Lemmon Survey	AGN	1.3 km	MPC · JPL
255279	2005 VN_{63}	—	November 1, 2005	Mount Lemmon	Mount Lemmon Survey	·	2.8 km	MPC · JPL
255280	2005 VU_{65}	—	November 1, 2005	Mount Lemmon	Mount Lemmon Survey	·	2.3 km	MPC · JPL
255281	2005 VW_{71}	—	November 1, 2005	Mount Lemmon	Mount Lemmon Survey	·	2.3 km	MPC · JPL
255282	2005 VX_{75}	—	November 3, 2005	Kitt Peak	Spacewatch	·	4.5 km	MPC · JPL
255283	2005 VA_{77}	—	November 4, 2005	Catalina	CSS	TIR	4.1 km	MPC · JPL
255284	2005 VO_{77}	—	November 5, 2005	Kitt Peak	Spacewatch	·	2.2 km	MPC · JPL
255285	2005 VF_{78}	—	November 6, 2005	Kitt Peak	Spacewatch	·	3.2 km	MPC · JPL
255286	2005 VS_{78}	—	November 6, 2005	Socorro	LINEAR	EOS	3.6 km	MPC · JPL
255287	2005 VS_{81}	—	November 6, 2005	Kitt Peak	Spacewatch	·	5.6 km	MPC · JPL
255288	2005 VE_{85}	—	November 4, 2005	Mount Lemmon	Mount Lemmon Survey	·	3.0 km	MPC · JPL
255289	2005 VF_{90}	—	November 6, 2005	Kitt Peak	Spacewatch	·	5.7 km	MPC · JPL
255290	2005 VF_{99}	—	November 10, 2005	Catalina	CSS	TIR	3.9 km	MPC · JPL
255291	2005 VJ_{102}	—	November 1, 2005	Kitt Peak	Spacewatch	·	2.5 km	MPC · JPL
255292	2005 VH_{107}	—	November 5, 2005	Kitt Peak	Spacewatch	HYG	3.2 km	MPC · JPL
255293	2005 VC_{109}	—	November 6, 2005	Mount Lemmon	Mount Lemmon Survey	·	1.9 km	MPC · JPL
255294	2005 VS_{112}	—	November 9, 2005	Campo Imperatore	CINEOS	·	2.9 km	MPC · JPL
255295	2005 VO_{113}	—	November 10, 2005	Kitt Peak	Spacewatch	·	3.4 km	MPC · JPL
255296	2005 VD_{116}	—	November 11, 2005	Kitt Peak	Spacewatch	·	4.7 km	MPC · JPL
255297	2005 VB_{118}	—	November 12, 2005	Kitt Peak	Spacewatch	·	4.3 km	MPC · JPL
255298	2005 VB_{119}	—	November 2, 2005	Socorro	LINEAR	·	3.7 km	MPC · JPL
255299	2005 VQ_{119}	—	November 5, 2005	Anderson Mesa	LONEOS	·	5.9 km	MPC · JPL
255300	2005 VL_{120}	—	November 10, 2005	Catalina	CSS	·	3.4 km	MPC · JPL

== 255301–255400 ==
back to top

Designation			Discovery			Properties		Ref
Permanent	Provisional	Named after	Date	Site	Discoverer(s)	Category	Diam.	Ref
255301	2005 VD_{121}	—	November 12, 2005	Catalina	CSS	·	4.5 km	MPC · JPL
255302	2005 VK_{122}	—	November 10, 2005	Catalina	CSS	·	5.0 km	MPC · JPL
255303	2005 VN_{125}	—	November 2, 2005	Catalina	CSS	·	5.1 km	MPC · JPL
255304	2005 VO_{129}	—	November 1, 2005	Apache Point	A. C. Becker	AGN	1.4 km	MPC · JPL
255305	2005 VN_{131}	—	November 1, 2005	Apache Point	A. C. Becker	·	4.3 km	MPC · JPL
255306	2005 VH_{132}	—	November 1, 2005	Apache Point	A. C. Becker	URS ·	3.5 km	MPC · JPL
255307	2005 WR	—	November 20, 2005	Wrightwood	J. W. Young	·	3.2 km	MPC · JPL
255308 Christianzuber	2005 WB_{5}	Christianzuber	November 20, 2005	Nogales	J.-C. Merlin	·	2.3 km	MPC · JPL
255309	2005 WJ_{8}	—	November 21, 2005	Kitt Peak	Spacewatch	THM	2.4 km	MPC · JPL
255310	2005 WA_{12}	—	November 22, 2005	Kitt Peak	Spacewatch	HYG	2.6 km	MPC · JPL
255311	2005 WC_{14}	—	November 22, 2005	Kitt Peak	Spacewatch	KOR	1.6 km	MPC · JPL
255312	2005 WA_{16}	—	November 22, 2005	Kitt Peak	Spacewatch	TEL	2.6 km	MPC · JPL
255313	2005 WJ_{19}	—	November 24, 2005	Palomar	NEAT	EOS	3.2 km	MPC · JPL
255314	2005 WN_{19}	—	November 24, 2005	Palomar	NEAT	·	3.6 km	MPC · JPL
255315	2005 WV_{21}	—	November 21, 2005	Kitt Peak	Spacewatch	·	4.8 km	MPC · JPL
255316	2005 WZ_{23}	—	November 21, 2005	Kitt Peak	Spacewatch	·	3.5 km	MPC · JPL
255317	2005 WD_{25}	—	November 21, 2005	Kitt Peak	Spacewatch	EOS	3.4 km	MPC · JPL
255318	2005 WH_{26}	—	November 21, 2005	Kitt Peak	Spacewatch	·	2.5 km	MPC · JPL
255319	2005 WV_{26}	—	November 21, 2005	Kitt Peak	Spacewatch	·	2.5 km	MPC · JPL
255320	2005 WR_{27}	—	November 21, 2005	Kitt Peak	Spacewatch	·	3.4 km	MPC · JPL
255321	2005 WJ_{29}	—	November 21, 2005	Kitt Peak	Spacewatch	EOS	2.9 km	MPC · JPL
255322	2005 WC_{30}	—	November 21, 2005	Kitt Peak	Spacewatch	·	4.0 km	MPC · JPL
255323	2005 WJ_{32}	—	November 21, 2005	Kitt Peak	Spacewatch	HYG	5.5 km	MPC · JPL
255324	2005 WT_{32}	—	November 21, 2005	Kitt Peak	Spacewatch	EMA	5.5 km	MPC · JPL
255325	2005 WU_{32}	—	November 21, 2005	Kitt Peak	Spacewatch	·	2.6 km	MPC · JPL
255326	2005 WB_{34}	—	November 21, 2005	Kitt Peak	Spacewatch	·	4.0 km	MPC · JPL
255327	2005 WX_{34}	—	November 21, 2005	Junk Bond	D. Healy	·	3.6 km	MPC · JPL
255328	2005 WL_{36}	—	November 22, 2005	Kitt Peak	Spacewatch	·	3.0 km	MPC · JPL
255329	2005 WA_{37}	—	November 22, 2005	Kitt Peak	Spacewatch	·	1.9 km	MPC · JPL
255330	2005 WW_{40}	—	November 19, 2005	Palomar	NEAT	·	4.9 km	MPC · JPL
255331	2005 WY_{40}	—	November 20, 2005	Palomar	NEAT	·	3.2 km	MPC · JPL
255332	2005 WR_{43}	—	November 21, 2005	Kitt Peak	Spacewatch	VER	4.7 km	MPC · JPL
255333	2005 WS_{44}	—	November 22, 2005	Kitt Peak	Spacewatch	·	2.9 km	MPC · JPL
255334	2005 WP_{45}	—	November 22, 2005	Kitt Peak	Spacewatch	·	2.7 km	MPC · JPL
255335	2005 WC_{52}	—	November 25, 2005	Mount Lemmon	Mount Lemmon Survey	KOR	1.5 km	MPC · JPL
255336	2005 WX_{52}	—	November 25, 2005	Mount Lemmon	Mount Lemmon Survey	KOR	1.6 km	MPC · JPL
255337	2005 WC_{55}	—	November 26, 2005	Junk Bond	D. Healy	BRA	1.8 km	MPC · JPL
255338	2005 WP_{59}	—	November 30, 2005	Socorro	LINEAR	H	800 m	MPC · JPL
255339	2005 WZ_{59}	—	November 21, 2005	Catalina	CSS	·	2.5 km	MPC · JPL
255340	2005 WO_{63}	—	November 25, 2005	Mount Lemmon	Mount Lemmon Survey	·	3.7 km	MPC · JPL
255341	2005 WA_{64}	—	November 25, 2005	Kitt Peak	Spacewatch	·	4.0 km	MPC · JPL
255342	2005 WE_{65}	—	November 25, 2005	Palomar	NEAT	·	4.4 km	MPC · JPL
255343	2005 WY_{65}	—	November 22, 2005	Kitt Peak	Spacewatch	·	3.9 km	MPC · JPL
255344	2005 WW_{67}	—	November 22, 2005	Kitt Peak	Spacewatch	·	2.5 km	MPC · JPL
255345	2005 WC_{68}	—	November 22, 2005	Kitt Peak	Spacewatch	EOS	3.2 km	MPC · JPL
255346	2005 WB_{71}	—	November 21, 2005	Catalina	CSS	·	3.2 km	MPC · JPL
255347	2005 WV_{75}	—	November 25, 2005	Kitt Peak	Spacewatch	·	5.6 km	MPC · JPL
255348	2005 WB_{77}	—	November 25, 2005	Kitt Peak	Spacewatch	·	3.5 km	MPC · JPL
255349	2005 WT_{77}	—	November 25, 2005	Kitt Peak	Spacewatch	·	3.6 km	MPC · JPL
255350	2005 WB_{82}	—	November 28, 2005	Socorro	LINEAR	·	3.8 km	MPC · JPL
255351	2005 WR_{83}	—	November 26, 2005	Mount Lemmon	Mount Lemmon Survey	·	2.5 km	MPC · JPL
255352	2005 WW_{83}	—	November 26, 2005	Mount Lemmon	Mount Lemmon Survey	·	3.5 km	MPC · JPL
255353	2005 WK_{88}	—	November 28, 2005	Mount Lemmon	Mount Lemmon Survey	H	820 m	MPC · JPL
255354	2005 WF_{90}	—	November 26, 2005	Mount Lemmon	Mount Lemmon Survey	·	5.1 km	MPC · JPL
255355	2005 WH_{93}	—	November 25, 2005	Mount Lemmon	Mount Lemmon Survey	·	2.0 km	MPC · JPL
255356	2005 WY_{93}	—	November 26, 2005	Kitt Peak	Spacewatch	THM	3.0 km	MPC · JPL
255357	2005 WJ_{94}	—	November 26, 2005	Kitt Peak	Spacewatch	·	2.5 km	MPC · JPL
255358	2005 WJ_{97}	—	November 26, 2005	Mount Lemmon	Mount Lemmon Survey	·	3.9 km	MPC · JPL
255359	2005 WW_{97}	—	November 26, 2005	Kitt Peak	Spacewatch	THM	2.6 km	MPC · JPL
255360	2005 WR_{99}	—	November 28, 2005	Mount Lemmon	Mount Lemmon Survey	·	2.9 km	MPC · JPL
255361	2005 WE_{100}	—	November 28, 2005	Catalina	CSS	THM	2.7 km	MPC · JPL
255362	2005 WT_{102}	—	November 25, 2005	Catalina	CSS	EOS	2.3 km	MPC · JPL
255363	2005 WB_{104}	—	November 28, 2005	Catalina	CSS	·	3.2 km	MPC · JPL
255364	2005 WY_{104}	—	November 29, 2005	Catalina	CSS	TIN	1.6 km	MPC · JPL
255365	2005 WZ_{104}	—	November 29, 2005	Catalina	CSS	TIR	4.5 km	MPC · JPL
255366	2005 WZ_{105}	—	November 29, 2005	Catalina	CSS	·	2.5 km	MPC · JPL
255367	2005 WE_{107}	—	November 25, 2005	Mount Lemmon	Mount Lemmon Survey	·	2.5 km	MPC · JPL
255368	2005 WA_{108}	—	November 28, 2005	Catalina	CSS	·	3.6 km	MPC · JPL
255369	2005 WO_{110}	—	November 30, 2005	Kitt Peak	Spacewatch	·	3.2 km	MPC · JPL
255370	2005 WS_{111}	—	November 30, 2005	Socorro	LINEAR	(5651)	5.1 km	MPC · JPL
255371	2005 WW_{111}	—	November 30, 2005	Socorro	LINEAR	EOS	2.7 km	MPC · JPL
255372	2005 WR_{113}	—	November 28, 2005	Kitt Peak	Spacewatch	·	3.5 km	MPC · JPL
255373	2005 WL_{115}	—	November 29, 2005	Mount Lemmon	Mount Lemmon Survey	·	2.7 km	MPC · JPL
255374	2005 WY_{115}	—	November 30, 2005	Socorro	LINEAR	·	4.3 km	MPC · JPL
255375	2005 WL_{116}	—	November 30, 2005	Socorro	LINEAR	·	2.5 km	MPC · JPL
255376	2005 WW_{117}	—	November 28, 2005	Socorro	LINEAR	·	3.7 km	MPC · JPL
255377	2005 WO_{119}	—	November 28, 2005	Catalina	CSS	HYG	2.9 km	MPC · JPL
255378	2005 WA_{123}	—	November 25, 2005	Mount Lemmon	Mount Lemmon Survey	AGN	1.5 km	MPC · JPL
255379	2005 WB_{127}	—	November 25, 2005	Mount Lemmon	Mount Lemmon Survey	THM	2.7 km	MPC · JPL
255380	2005 WS_{136}	—	November 26, 2005	Mount Lemmon	Mount Lemmon Survey	·	3.3 km	MPC · JPL
255381	2005 WL_{137}	—	November 26, 2005	Mount Lemmon	Mount Lemmon Survey	·	3.1 km	MPC · JPL
255382	2005 WL_{138}	—	November 26, 2005	Mount Lemmon	Mount Lemmon Survey	·	4.2 km	MPC · JPL
255383	2005 WG_{142}	—	November 29, 2005	Kitt Peak	Spacewatch	·	3.6 km	MPC · JPL
255384	2005 WS_{147}	—	November 25, 2005	Catalina	CSS	·	4.0 km	MPC · JPL
255385	2005 WR_{151}	—	November 28, 2005	Socorro	LINEAR	·	3.3 km	MPC · JPL
255386	2005 WS_{151}	—	November 28, 2005	Socorro	LINEAR	·	4.7 km	MPC · JPL
255387	2005 WO_{152}	—	November 29, 2005	Kitt Peak	Spacewatch	·	3.4 km	MPC · JPL
255388	2005 WG_{156}	—	November 29, 2005	Palomar	NEAT	EOS	3.0 km	MPC · JPL
255389	2005 WO_{158}	—	November 28, 2005	Socorro	LINEAR	H	960 m	MPC · JPL
255390	2005 WS_{158}	—	November 28, 2005	Mount Lemmon	Mount Lemmon Survey	·	5.3 km	MPC · JPL
255391	2005 WL_{159}	—	November 29, 2005	Catalina	CSS	EOS	2.2 km	MPC · JPL
255392	2005 WS_{160}	—	November 28, 2005	Kitt Peak	Spacewatch	·	2.8 km	MPC · JPL
255393	2005 WG_{163}	—	November 29, 2005	Kitt Peak	Spacewatch	·	4.8 km	MPC · JPL
255394	2005 WE_{166}	—	November 29, 2005	Mount Lemmon	Mount Lemmon Survey	·	3.1 km	MPC · JPL
255395	2005 WX_{166}	—	November 29, 2005	Mount Lemmon	Mount Lemmon Survey	·	2.5 km	MPC · JPL
255396	2005 WY_{166}	—	November 29, 2005	Mount Lemmon	Mount Lemmon Survey	·	2.3 km	MPC · JPL
255397	2005 WS_{178}	—	November 21, 2005	Catalina	CSS	·	4.2 km	MPC · JPL
255398	2005 WF_{182}	—	November 25, 2005	Catalina	CSS	·	4.5 km	MPC · JPL
255399	2005 WF_{185}	—	November 29, 2005	Catalina	CSS	·	3.1 km	MPC · JPL
255400	2005 WE_{186}	—	November 30, 2005	Socorro	LINEAR	LUT	7.6 km	MPC · JPL

== 255401–255500 ==
back to top

Designation			Discovery			Properties		Ref
Permanent	Provisional	Named after	Date	Site	Discoverer(s)	Category	Diam.	Ref
255401	2005 WA_{188}	—	November 30, 2005	Catalina	CSS	·	2.4 km	MPC · JPL
255402	2005 WA_{189}	—	November 30, 2005	Socorro	LINEAR	EOS	3.1 km	MPC · JPL
255403	2005 WW_{189}	—	November 19, 2005	Palomar	NEAT	·	4.1 km	MPC · JPL
255404	2005 WQ_{190}	—	November 21, 2005	Catalina	CSS	EOS	3.3 km	MPC · JPL
255405	2005 WV_{197}	—	November 22, 2005	Kitt Peak	Spacewatch	AGN	1.8 km	MPC · JPL
255406	2005 WV_{207}	—	November 26, 2005	Kitt Peak	Spacewatch	·	4.6 km	MPC · JPL
255407	2005 WW_{207}	—	November 28, 2005	Kitt Peak	Spacewatch	HYG	3.2 km	MPC · JPL
255408	2005 XP_{2}	—	December 1, 2005	Kitt Peak	Spacewatch	·	3.2 km	MPC · JPL
255409	2005 XA_{5}	—	December 6, 2005	Mayhill	Lowe, A.	·	4.4 km	MPC · JPL
255410	2005 XF_{9}	—	December 1, 2005	Kitt Peak	Spacewatch	LIX	5.9 km	MPC · JPL
255411	2005 XY_{11}	—	December 1, 2005	Mount Lemmon	Mount Lemmon Survey	AGN	1.4 km	MPC · JPL
255412	2005 XB_{12}	—	December 1, 2005	Socorro	LINEAR	·	3.1 km	MPC · JPL
255413	2005 XF_{14}	—	December 1, 2005	Kitt Peak	Spacewatch	·	2.8 km	MPC · JPL
255414	2005 XC_{19}	—	December 2, 2005	Mount Lemmon	Mount Lemmon Survey	·	3.0 km	MPC · JPL
255415	2005 XQ_{23}	—	December 2, 2005	Mount Lemmon	Mount Lemmon Survey	·	2.9 km	MPC · JPL
255416	2005 XT_{28}	—	December 2, 2005	Socorro	LINEAR	·	3.0 km	MPC · JPL
255417	2005 XK_{29}	—	December 4, 2005	Socorro	LINEAR	·	5.0 km	MPC · JPL
255418	2005 XO_{36}	—	December 4, 2005	Kitt Peak	Spacewatch	·	5.4 km	MPC · JPL
255419	2005 XH_{50}	—	December 2, 2005	Kitt Peak	Spacewatch	·	3.7 km	MPC · JPL
255420	2005 XQ_{56}	—	December 5, 2005	Socorro	LINEAR	·	3.4 km	MPC · JPL
255421	2005 XT_{56}	—	December 6, 2005	Kitt Peak	Spacewatch	EUP	7.1 km	MPC · JPL
255422	2005 XP_{58}	—	December 2, 2005	Mount Lemmon	Mount Lemmon Survey	THM	3.2 km	MPC · JPL
255423	2005 XB_{61}	—	December 4, 2005	Kitt Peak	Spacewatch	THM	3.3 km	MPC · JPL
255424	2005 XD_{61}	—	December 4, 2005	Kitt Peak	Spacewatch	·	2.6 km	MPC · JPL
255425	2005 XO_{71}	—	December 6, 2005	Kitt Peak	Spacewatch	fast	4.1 km	MPC · JPL
255426	2005 XS_{71}	—	December 6, 2005	Kitt Peak	Spacewatch	·	4.6 km	MPC · JPL
255427	2005 XH_{73}	—	December 6, 2005	Kitt Peak	Spacewatch	·	5.0 km	MPC · JPL
255428	2005 XM_{74}	—	December 6, 2005	Kitt Peak	Spacewatch	·	3.8 km	MPC · JPL
255429	2005 XH_{76}	—	December 7, 2005	Kitt Peak	Spacewatch	·	2.2 km	MPC · JPL
255430	2005 XC_{77}	—	December 8, 2005	Kitt Peak	Spacewatch	KOR	1.6 km	MPC · JPL
255431	2005 XC_{79}	—	December 4, 2005	Catalina	CSS	AEG	4.8 km	MPC · JPL
255432	2005 XG_{79}	—	December 8, 2005	Catalina	CSS	·	4.9 km	MPC · JPL
255433	2005 XB_{82}	—	December 8, 2005	Kitt Peak	Spacewatch	·	2.0 km	MPC · JPL
255434	2005 XG_{82}	—	December 8, 2005	Kitt Peak	Spacewatch	·	4.6 km	MPC · JPL
255435	2005 XH_{82}	—	December 10, 2005	Kitt Peak	Spacewatch	·	3.1 km	MPC · JPL
255436	2005 XS_{83}	—	December 5, 2005	Socorro	LINEAR	·	5.7 km	MPC · JPL
255437	2005 XK_{84}	—	December 8, 2005	Socorro	LINEAR	·	3.4 km	MPC · JPL
255438	2005 XE_{87}	—	December 10, 2005	Kitt Peak	Spacewatch	·	2.8 km	MPC · JPL
255439	2005 XE_{117}	—	December 8, 2005	Kitt Peak	Spacewatch	THM	3.0 km	MPC · JPL
255440	2005 YW_{2}	—	December 21, 2005	Catalina	CSS	THB	4.8 km	MPC · JPL
255441	2005 YF_{4}	—	December 23, 2005	Socorro	LINEAR	H	760 m	MPC · JPL
255442	2005 YW_{11}	—	December 21, 2005	Kitt Peak	Spacewatch	·	6.1 km	MPC · JPL
255443	2005 YB_{14}	—	December 22, 2005	Kitt Peak	Spacewatch	·	5.1 km	MPC · JPL
255444	2005 YC_{14}	—	December 22, 2005	Kitt Peak	Spacewatch	·	3.7 km	MPC · JPL
255445	2005 YO_{20}	—	December 24, 2005	Kitt Peak	Spacewatch	·	2.8 km	MPC · JPL
255446	2005 YV_{21}	—	December 24, 2005	Kitt Peak	Spacewatch	THM	2.7 km	MPC · JPL
255447	2005 YN_{24}	—	December 24, 2005	Kitt Peak	Spacewatch	THM	2.7 km	MPC · JPL
255448	2005 YB_{26}	—	December 24, 2005	Kitt Peak	Spacewatch	THM	3.2 km	MPC · JPL
255449	2005 YJ_{30}	—	December 21, 2005	Kitt Peak	Spacewatch	·	2.5 km	MPC · JPL
255450	2005 YZ_{35}	—	December 25, 2005	Kitt Peak	Spacewatch	·	4.5 km	MPC · JPL
255451	2005 YB_{36}	—	December 25, 2005	Kitt Peak	Spacewatch	·	4.1 km	MPC · JPL
255452	2005 YC_{38}	—	December 21, 2005	Catalina	CSS	·	5.1 km	MPC · JPL
255453	2005 YW_{42}	—	December 24, 2005	Kitt Peak	Spacewatch	THM	2.7 km	MPC · JPL
255454	2005 YP_{47}	—	December 26, 2005	Kitt Peak	Spacewatch	·	3.5 km	MPC · JPL
255455	2005 YC_{50}	—	December 25, 2005	Kitt Peak	Spacewatch	·	2.7 km	MPC · JPL
255456	2005 YW_{52}	—	December 22, 2005	Catalina	CSS	H	820 m	MPC · JPL
255457	2005 YG_{55}	—	December 25, 2005	Kitt Peak	Spacewatch	·	3.0 km	MPC · JPL
255458	2005 YW_{72}	—	December 24, 2005	Kitt Peak	Spacewatch	·	4.4 km	MPC · JPL
255459	2005 YB_{76}	—	December 24, 2005	Kitt Peak	Spacewatch	CYB	6.9 km	MPC · JPL
255460	2005 YS_{77}	—	December 24, 2005	Kitt Peak	Spacewatch	THM	2.8 km	MPC · JPL
255461	2005 YO_{78}	—	December 24, 2005	Kitt Peak	Spacewatch	THM	1.9 km	MPC · JPL
255462	2005 YP_{82}	—	December 24, 2005	Kitt Peak	Spacewatch	THM	3.5 km	MPC · JPL
255463	2005 YC_{84}	—	December 24, 2005	Kitt Peak	Spacewatch	·	2.3 km	MPC · JPL
255464	2005 YJ_{86}	—	December 25, 2005	Mount Lemmon	Mount Lemmon Survey	CYB	2.9 km	MPC · JPL
255465	2005 YU_{86}	—	December 25, 2005	Mount Lemmon	Mount Lemmon Survey	HYG	3.2 km	MPC · JPL
255466	2005 YG_{93}	—	December 27, 2005	Kitt Peak	Spacewatch	·	3.6 km	MPC · JPL
255467	2005 YG_{98}	—	December 25, 2005	Kitt Peak	Spacewatch	·	2.9 km	MPC · JPL
255468	2005 YJ_{112}	—	December 25, 2005	Mount Lemmon	Mount Lemmon Survey	·	4.4 km	MPC · JPL
255469	2005 YK_{121}	—	December 28, 2005	Mount Lemmon	Mount Lemmon Survey	·	4.0 km	MPC · JPL
255470	2005 YV_{123}	—	December 24, 2005	Palomar	NEAT	LIX	5.9 km	MPC · JPL
255471	2005 YP_{127}	—	December 28, 2005	Socorro	LINEAR	·	4.6 km	MPC · JPL
255472	2005 YG_{142}	—	December 28, 2005	Mount Lemmon	Mount Lemmon Survey	·	4.4 km	MPC · JPL
255473	2005 YW_{158}	—	December 27, 2005	Kitt Peak	Spacewatch	·	5.6 km	MPC · JPL
255474	2005 YJ_{165}	—	December 30, 2005	Socorro	LINEAR	(31811)	5.4 km	MPC · JPL
255475	2005 YN_{165}	—	December 30, 2005	Socorro	LINEAR	TIR	3.1 km	MPC · JPL
255476	2005 YR_{167}	—	December 27, 2005	Kitt Peak	Spacewatch	·	2.2 km	MPC · JPL
255477	2005 YP_{169}	—	December 30, 2005	Socorro	LINEAR	·	4.3 km	MPC · JPL
255478	2005 YR_{181}	—	December 24, 2005	Socorro	LINEAR	·	5.6 km	MPC · JPL
255479	2005 YF_{185}	—	December 27, 2005	Kitt Peak	Spacewatch	·	4.0 km	MPC · JPL
255480	2005 YB_{209}	—	December 22, 2005	Catalina	CSS	TIR	3.7 km	MPC · JPL
255481	2005 YR_{214}	—	December 30, 2005	Catalina	CSS	H	870 m	MPC · JPL
255482	2005 YS_{214}	—	December 30, 2005	Catalina	CSS	·	4.3 km	MPC · JPL
255483	2005 YU_{222}	—	December 21, 2005	Kitt Peak	Spacewatch	·	2.3 km	MPC · JPL
255484	2005 YY_{231}	—	December 28, 2005	Kitt Peak	Spacewatch	·	2.0 km	MPC · JPL
255485	2005 YL_{235}	—	December 28, 2005	Mount Lemmon	Mount Lemmon Survey	·	4.1 km	MPC · JPL
255486	2005 YZ_{275}	—	December 21, 2005	Kitt Peak	Spacewatch	·	2.4 km	MPC · JPL
255487	2006 AT_{4}	—	January 2, 2006	Catalina	CSS	·	6.0 km	MPC · JPL
255488	2006 AN_{6}	—	January 5, 2006	Socorro	LINEAR	EOS	2.8 km	MPC · JPL
255489	2006 AS_{7}	—	January 5, 2006	Catalina	CSS	·	6.5 km	MPC · JPL
255490	2006 AY_{7}	—	January 7, 2006	Anderson Mesa	LONEOS	·	3.4 km	MPC · JPL
255491	2006 AO_{20}	—	January 5, 2006	Catalina	CSS	·	1.0 km	MPC · JPL
255492	2006 AL_{28}	—	January 6, 2006	Kitt Peak	Spacewatch	·	2.5 km	MPC · JPL
255493	2006 AP_{34}	—	January 6, 2006	Catalina	CSS	·	4.6 km	MPC · JPL
255494	2006 AJ_{36}	—	January 4, 2006	Kitt Peak	Spacewatch	·	4.0 km	MPC · JPL
255495	2006 AZ_{68}	—	January 6, 2006	Kitt Peak	Spacewatch	·	6.4 km	MPC · JPL
255496	2006 AE_{75}	—	January 2, 2006	Socorro	LINEAR	·	4.6 km	MPC · JPL
255497	2006 AX_{83}	—	January 5, 2006	Catalina	CSS	EOS	2.9 km	MPC · JPL
255498	2006 AV_{85}	—	January 10, 2006	Catalina	CSS	·	5.8 km	MPC · JPL
255499	2006 AX_{96}	—	January 2, 2006	Catalina	CSS	·	4.9 km	MPC · JPL
255500	2006 AX_{97}	—	January 7, 2006	Catalina	CSS	H	760 m	MPC · JPL

== 255501–255600 ==
back to top

Designation			Discovery			Properties		Ref
Permanent	Provisional	Named after	Date	Site	Discoverer(s)	Category	Diam.	Ref
255501	2006 BG	—	January 20, 2006	Catalina	CSS	APO	660 m	MPC · JPL
255502	2006 BR_{1}	—	January 20, 2006	Kitt Peak	Spacewatch	·	3.7 km	MPC · JPL
255503	2006 BS_{17}	—	January 22, 2006	Anderson Mesa	LONEOS	CYB	4.3 km	MPC · JPL
255504	2006 BV_{26}	—	January 22, 2006	Catalina	CSS	CYB	6.7 km	MPC · JPL
255505	2006 BE_{27}	—	January 20, 2006	Kitt Peak	Spacewatch	·	3.2 km	MPC · JPL
255506	2006 BR_{55}	—	January 27, 2006	Mayhill	Hutsebaut, R.	·	4.0 km	MPC · JPL
255507	2006 BC_{74}	—	January 23, 2006	Kitt Peak	Spacewatch	·	4.5 km	MPC · JPL
255508	2006 BG_{83}	—	January 24, 2006	Socorro	LINEAR	·	4.2 km	MPC · JPL
255509	2006 BR_{96}	—	January 26, 2006	Kitt Peak	Spacewatch	·	910 m	MPC · JPL
255510	2006 BM_{145}	—	January 23, 2006	Socorro	LINEAR	HYG	4.4 km	MPC · JPL
255511	2006 BO_{145}	—	January 23, 2006	Socorro	LINEAR	·	5.3 km	MPC · JPL
255512	2006 BT_{166}	—	January 26, 2006	Mount Lemmon	Mount Lemmon Survey	HYG	3.6 km	MPC · JPL
255513	2006 BO_{185}	—	January 28, 2006	Anderson Mesa	LONEOS	HYG	3.8 km	MPC · JPL
255514	2006 BF_{214}	—	January 23, 2006	Catalina	CSS	·	3.0 km	MPC · JPL
255515	2006 BU_{226}	—	January 30, 2006	Catalina	CSS	·	6.2 km	MPC · JPL
255516	2006 BP_{260}	—	January 31, 2006	Kitt Peak	Spacewatch	CYB	4.5 km	MPC · JPL
255517	2006 BY_{267}	—	January 26, 2006	Catalina	CSS	·	4.3 km	MPC · JPL
255518	2006 CL_{42}	—	February 2, 2006	Kitt Peak	Spacewatch	·	1.4 km	MPC · JPL
255519	2006 CN_{61}	—	February 3, 2006	Anderson Mesa	LONEOS	·	5.6 km	MPC · JPL
255520	2006 CN_{67}	—	February 6, 2006	Mount Lemmon	Mount Lemmon Survey	·	1.2 km	MPC · JPL
255521	2006 DV_{4}	—	February 20, 2006	Kitt Peak	Spacewatch	·	810 m	MPC · JPL
255522	2006 DQ_{5}	—	February 20, 2006	Catalina	CSS	·	2.2 km	MPC · JPL
255523	2006 DV_{61}	—	February 20, 2006	Socorro	LINEAR	·	4.7 km	MPC · JPL
255524	2006 DY_{69}	—	February 20, 2006	Kitt Peak	Spacewatch	·	980 m	MPC · JPL
255525	2006 DU_{215}	—	February 24, 2006	Kitt Peak	Spacewatch	HIL · 3:2	8.2 km	MPC · JPL
255526	2006 ET_{42}	—	March 4, 2006	Kitt Peak	Spacewatch	·	710 m	MPC · JPL
255527	2006 ET_{44}	—	March 2, 2006	Kitt Peak	Spacewatch	·	460 m	MPC · JPL
255528	2006 FP_{21}	—	March 24, 2006	Mount Lemmon	Mount Lemmon Survey	·	930 m	MPC · JPL
255529	2006 FL_{49}	—	March 25, 2006	Catalina	CSS	T_{j} (2.94)	5.2 km	MPC · JPL
255530	2006 FK_{51}	—	March 24, 2006	Kitt Peak	Spacewatch	V	970 m	MPC · JPL
255531	2006 GS_{1}	—	April 2, 2006	Kitt Peak	Spacewatch	·	1.2 km	MPC · JPL
255532	2006 HU_{19}	—	April 19, 2006	Mount Lemmon	Mount Lemmon Survey	·	790 m	MPC · JPL
255533	2006 HC_{25}	—	April 20, 2006	Kitt Peak	Spacewatch	·	880 m	MPC · JPL
255534	2006 HK_{40}	—	April 21, 2006	Catalina	CSS	·	930 m	MPC · JPL
255535	2006 HS_{56}	—	April 19, 2006	Catalina	CSS	·	970 m	MPC · JPL
255536	2006 HB_{60}	—	April 25, 2006	Palomar	NEAT	·	1.1 km	MPC · JPL
255537	2006 HB_{66}	—	April 24, 2006	Kitt Peak	Spacewatch	·	770 m	MPC · JPL
255538	2006 HD_{80}	—	April 26, 2006	Kitt Peak	Spacewatch	·	1.5 km	MPC · JPL
255539	2006 HX_{81}	—	April 26, 2006	Kitt Peak	Spacewatch	·	1.0 km	MPC · JPL
255540	2006 HY_{105}	—	April 29, 2006	Siding Spring	SSS	CYB	6.9 km	MPC · JPL
255541	2006 HV_{111}	—	April 30, 2006	Catalina	CSS	·	700 m	MPC · JPL
255542	2006 HB_{120}	—	April 30, 2006	Kitt Peak	Spacewatch	·	950 m	MPC · JPL
255543	2006 JW_{6}	—	May 1, 2006	Kitt Peak	Spacewatch	·	840 m	MPC · JPL
255544	2006 JX_{8}	—	May 1, 2006	Kitt Peak	Spacewatch	·	640 m	MPC · JPL
255545	2006 JC_{13}	—	May 1, 2006	Kitt Peak	Spacewatch	·	870 m	MPC · JPL
255546	2006 JE_{14}	—	May 4, 2006	Mount Lemmon	Mount Lemmon Survey	·	920 m	MPC · JPL
255547	2006 JT_{19}	—	May 2, 2006	Mount Lemmon	Mount Lemmon Survey	·	980 m	MPC · JPL
255548	2006 JM_{25}	—	May 5, 2006	Mount Lemmon	Mount Lemmon Survey	·	830 m	MPC · JPL
255549	2006 JP_{25}	—	May 5, 2006	Mount Lemmon	Mount Lemmon Survey	NYS	1.3 km	MPC · JPL
255550	2006 JB_{26}	—	May 2, 2006	Reedy Creek	J. Broughton	·	840 m	MPC · JPL
255551	2006 JF_{29}	—	May 3, 2006	Kitt Peak	Spacewatch	·	690 m	MPC · JPL
255552	2006 JL_{39}	—	May 6, 2006	Mount Lemmon	Mount Lemmon Survey	NYS	840 m	MPC · JPL
255553	2006 JN_{46}	—	May 7, 2006	Kitt Peak	Spacewatch	·	2.2 km	MPC · JPL
255554	2006 JK_{52}	—	May 5, 2006	Mount Lemmon	Mount Lemmon Survey	·	830 m	MPC · JPL
255555	2006 JR_{57}	—	May 8, 2006	Mount Lemmon	Mount Lemmon Survey	·	930 m	MPC · JPL
255556	2006 KE_{4}	—	May 19, 2006	Catalina	CSS	·	1.1 km	MPC · JPL
255557	2006 KQ_{11}	—	May 19, 2006	Palomar	NEAT	EUN	1.4 km	MPC · JPL
255558	2006 KS_{20}	—	May 18, 2006	Palomar	NEAT	(2076)	900 m	MPC · JPL
255559	2006 KK_{27}	—	May 20, 2006	Mount Lemmon	Mount Lemmon Survey	·	1.0 km	MPC · JPL
255560	2006 KS_{27}	—	May 20, 2006	Kitt Peak	Spacewatch	·	970 m	MPC · JPL
255561	2006 KY_{42}	—	May 20, 2006	Mount Lemmon	Mount Lemmon Survey	BAP	1.3 km	MPC · JPL
255562	2006 KT_{43}	—	May 20, 2006	Siding Spring	SSS	·	5.7 km	MPC · JPL
255563	2006 KH_{49}	—	May 21, 2006	Kitt Peak	Spacewatch	·	1.0 km	MPC · JPL
255564	2006 KM_{51}	—	May 21, 2006	Kitt Peak	Spacewatch	·	910 m	MPC · JPL
255565	2006 KY_{65}	—	May 24, 2006	Mount Lemmon	Mount Lemmon Survey	·	1.7 km	MPC · JPL
255566	2006 KK_{77}	—	May 24, 2006	Mount Lemmon	Mount Lemmon Survey	·	1.0 km	MPC · JPL
255567	2006 KS_{80}	—	May 25, 2006	Mount Lemmon	Mount Lemmon Survey	·	1.3 km	MPC · JPL
255568	2006 KZ_{82}	—	May 19, 2006	Mount Lemmon	Mount Lemmon Survey	·	910 m	MPC · JPL
255569	2006 KS_{85}	—	May 20, 2006	Siding Spring	SSS	·	5.4 km	MPC · JPL
255570	2006 KP_{86}	—	May 24, 2006	Palomar	NEAT	·	1.2 km	MPC · JPL
255571	2006 KY_{100}	—	May 24, 2006	Mount Lemmon	Mount Lemmon Survey	·	960 m	MPC · JPL
255572	2006 KA_{107}	—	May 31, 2006	Mount Lemmon	Mount Lemmon Survey	·	1.2 km	MPC · JPL
255573	2006 KW_{107}	—	May 31, 2006	Mount Lemmon	Mount Lemmon Survey	·	800 m	MPC · JPL
255574	2006 KW_{117}	—	May 31, 2006	Mount Lemmon	Mount Lemmon Survey	·	590 m	MPC · JPL
255575	2006 KM_{120}	—	May 31, 2006	Kitt Peak	Spacewatch	·	790 m	MPC · JPL
255576	2006 KU_{120}	—	May 19, 2006	Anderson Mesa	LONEOS	·	870 m	MPC · JPL
255577	2006 KY_{123}	—	May 25, 2006	Kitt Peak	Spacewatch	PHO	1.6 km	MPC · JPL
255578	2006 KO_{126}	—	May 26, 2006	Mount Lemmon	Mount Lemmon Survey	·	1.7 km	MPC · JPL
255579	2006 LQ_{1}	—	June 5, 2006	Socorro	LINEAR	·	960 m	MPC · JPL
255580	2006 LW_{4}	—	June 9, 2006	Palomar	NEAT	PHO	1.5 km	MPC · JPL
255581	2006 LM_{5}	—	June 15, 2006	Lulin	Q. Ye	·	680 m	MPC · JPL
255582	2006 LY_{6}	—	June 11, 2006	Palomar	NEAT	·	1.6 km	MPC · JPL
255583	2006 MH_{3}	—	June 19, 2006	Mount Lemmon	Mount Lemmon Survey	·	1.5 km	MPC · JPL
255584	2006 MH_{9}	—	June 19, 2006	Mount Lemmon	Mount Lemmon Survey	·	3.6 km	MPC · JPL
255585	2006 NZ	—	July 8, 2006	Siding Spring	SSS	·	1.5 km	MPC · JPL
255586	2006 OU_{1}	—	July 17, 2006	Reedy Creek	J. Broughton	·	1.2 km	MPC · JPL
255587 Gardenia	2006 OU_{4}	Gardenia	July 21, 2006	Vallemare Borbona	V. S. Casulli	·	1.2 km	MPC · JPL
255588	2006 OJ_{5}	—	July 18, 2006	Mayhill	Mayhill	·	1.5 km	MPC · JPL
255589	2006 OM_{5}	—	July 19, 2006	Palomar	NEAT	(2076)	1.0 km	MPC · JPL
255590	2006 ON_{5}	—	July 19, 2006	Palomar	NEAT	NYS	1.1 km	MPC · JPL
255591	2006 OB_{6}	—	July 21, 2006	Socorro	LINEAR	·	1.5 km	MPC · JPL
255592	2006 OG_{10}	—	July 24, 2006	Vicques	M. Ory	NYS	1.7 km	MPC · JPL
255593	2006 OW_{10}	—	July 26, 2006	Hibiscus	S. F. Hönig	NYS	1.2 km	MPC · JPL
255594	2006 OE_{14}	—	July 25, 2006	Palomar	NEAT	V	960 m	MPC · JPL
255595	2006 OB_{15}	—	July 26, 2006	Reedy Creek	J. Broughton	·	1.0 km	MPC · JPL
255596	2006 OD_{16}	—	July 20, 2006	Reedy Creek	J. Broughton	·	1 km	MPC · JPL
255597	2006 OL_{17}	—	July 25, 2006	Palomar	NEAT	MAS	1.1 km	MPC · JPL
255598 Paullauterbur	2006 PE_{1}	Paullauterbur	August 13, 2006	Vallemare Borbona	V. S. Casulli	·	1.3 km	MPC · JPL
255599	2006 PC_{2}	—	August 12, 2006	Palomar	NEAT	·	1.7 km	MPC · JPL
255600	2006 PC_{4}	—	August 15, 2006	Reedy Creek	J. Broughton	ERI	2.1 km	MPC · JPL

== 255601–255700 ==
back to top

Designation			Discovery			Properties		Ref
Permanent	Provisional	Named after	Date	Site	Discoverer(s)	Category	Diam.	Ref
255601	2006 PD_{4}	—	August 15, 2006	Reedy Creek	J. Broughton	·	2.7 km	MPC · JPL
255602	2006 PG_{7}	—	August 12, 2006	Palomar	NEAT	PHO	970 m	MPC · JPL
255603	2006 PD_{8}	—	August 12, 2006	Lulin	Lin, H.-C., Q. Ye	·	1.3 km	MPC · JPL
255604	2006 PY_{10}	—	August 13, 2006	Palomar	NEAT	·	1.9 km	MPC · JPL
255605	2006 PZ_{11}	—	August 13, 2006	Palomar	NEAT	·	990 m	MPC · JPL
255606	2006 PA_{12}	—	August 13, 2006	Palomar	NEAT	·	1.7 km	MPC · JPL
255607	2006 PR_{13}	—	August 14, 2006	Siding Spring	SSS	·	1.3 km	MPC · JPL
255608	2006 PS_{13}	—	August 14, 2006	Siding Spring	SSS	·	1.1 km	MPC · JPL
255609	2006 PY_{14}	—	August 15, 2006	Palomar	NEAT	·	1.7 km	MPC · JPL
255610	2006 PT_{15}	—	August 15, 2006	Palomar	NEAT	·	1.6 km	MPC · JPL
255611	2006 PZ_{15}	—	August 15, 2006	Palomar	NEAT	·	880 m	MPC · JPL
255612	2006 PW_{16}	—	August 15, 2006	Palomar	NEAT	MAS	910 m	MPC · JPL
255613	2006 PF_{17}	—	August 15, 2006	Palomar	NEAT	·	2.0 km	MPC · JPL
255614	2006 PS_{17}	—	August 15, 2006	Palomar	NEAT	·	1.7 km	MPC · JPL
255615	2006 PK_{18}	—	August 13, 2006	Palomar	NEAT	MAS	870 m	MPC · JPL
255616	2006 PK_{19}	—	August 13, 2006	Palomar	NEAT	·	850 m	MPC · JPL
255617	2006 PE_{21}	—	August 15, 2006	Palomar	NEAT	MAS	830 m	MPC · JPL
255618	2006 PP_{21}	—	August 15, 2006	Palomar	NEAT	·	1.4 km	MPC · JPL
255619	2006 PG_{22}	—	August 15, 2006	Palomar	NEAT	·	1.6 km	MPC · JPL
255620	2006 PV_{22}	—	August 15, 2006	Palomar	NEAT	MAS	880 m	MPC · JPL
255621	2006 PX_{22}	—	August 15, 2006	Palomar	NEAT	·	1.5 km	MPC · JPL
255622	2006 PR_{25}	—	August 13, 2006	Palomar	NEAT	·	1.2 km	MPC · JPL
255623	2006 PV_{25}	—	August 13, 2006	Palomar	NEAT	V	890 m	MPC · JPL
255624	2006 PA_{28}	—	August 14, 2006	Siding Spring	SSS	PHO	1.4 km	MPC · JPL
255625	2006 PC_{28}	—	August 14, 2006	Siding Spring	SSS	·	3.2 km	MPC · JPL
255626	2006 PZ_{29}	—	August 12, 2006	Palomar	NEAT	NYS	1.2 km	MPC · JPL
255627	2006 PL_{32}	—	August 15, 2006	Palomar	NEAT	V	960 m	MPC · JPL
255628	2006 PT_{39}	—	August 14, 2006	Palomar	NEAT	·	1.5 km	MPC · JPL
255629	2006 PP_{42}	—	August 14, 2006	Siding Spring	SSS	·	990 m	MPC · JPL
255630	2006 QL_{1}	—	August 16, 2006	Siding Spring	SSS	V	830 m	MPC · JPL
255631	2006 QN_{1}	—	August 16, 2006	Siding Spring	SSS	V	960 m	MPC · JPL
255632	2006 QO_{2}	—	August 17, 2006	Palomar	NEAT	·	1.4 km	MPC · JPL
255633	2006 QP_{2}	—	August 17, 2006	Palomar	NEAT	·	1.8 km	MPC · JPL
255634	2006 QR_{2}	—	August 17, 2006	Palomar	NEAT	·	1.5 km	MPC · JPL
255635	2006 QB_{5}	—	August 19, 2006	Kitt Peak	Spacewatch	·	1.5 km	MPC · JPL
255636	2006 QJ_{6}	—	August 17, 2006	Palomar	NEAT	NYS	1.5 km	MPC · JPL
255637	2006 QL_{6}	—	August 17, 2006	Socorro	LINEAR	·	1.1 km	MPC · JPL
255638	2006 QN_{6}	—	August 17, 2006	Palomar	NEAT	·	1.3 km	MPC · JPL
255639	2006 QR_{7}	—	August 19, 2006	Kitt Peak	Spacewatch	·	1.6 km	MPC · JPL
255640	2006 QL_{8}	—	August 19, 2006	Kitt Peak	Spacewatch	·	940 m	MPC · JPL
255641	2006 QH_{9}	—	August 19, 2006	Palomar	NEAT	·	1.6 km	MPC · JPL
255642	2006 QG_{12}	—	August 16, 2006	Siding Spring	SSS	NYS	1.2 km	MPC · JPL
255643	2006 QG_{13}	—	August 16, 2006	Siding Spring	SSS	·	1.7 km	MPC · JPL
255644	2006 QH_{14}	—	August 17, 2006	Palomar	NEAT	·	1.3 km	MPC · JPL
255645	2006 QP_{15}	—	August 17, 2006	Palomar	NEAT	·	1.3 km	MPC · JPL
255646	2006 QF_{18}	—	August 17, 2006	Palomar	NEAT	·	1.6 km	MPC · JPL
255647	2006 QA_{19}	—	August 17, 2006	Palomar	NEAT	·	1.7 km	MPC · JPL
255648	2006 QD_{19}	—	August 17, 2006	Palomar	NEAT	NYS	1.4 km	MPC · JPL
255649	2006 QO_{19}	—	August 17, 2006	Palomar	NEAT	·	1.5 km	MPC · JPL
255650	2006 QT_{19}	—	August 17, 2006	Palomar	NEAT	·	2.4 km	MPC · JPL
255651	2006 QK_{21}	—	August 19, 2006	Kitt Peak	Spacewatch	NYS	1.2 km	MPC · JPL
255652	2006 QQ_{21}	—	August 19, 2006	Anderson Mesa	LONEOS	NYS	1.7 km	MPC · JPL
255653	2006 QY_{24}	—	August 18, 2006	Socorro	LINEAR	·	1.3 km	MPC · JPL
255654	2006 QO_{26}	—	August 19, 2006	Kitt Peak	Spacewatch	NYS	1.0 km	MPC · JPL
255655	2006 QS_{26}	—	August 19, 2006	Kitt Peak	Spacewatch	·	990 m	MPC · JPL
255656	2006 QG_{27}	—	August 19, 2006	Kitt Peak	Spacewatch	V	960 m	MPC · JPL
255657	2006 QX_{27}	—	August 20, 2006	Palomar	NEAT	NYS	1.3 km	MPC · JPL
255658	2006 QL_{28}	—	August 21, 2006	Socorro	LINEAR	NYS	1.6 km	MPC · JPL
255659	2006 QW_{28}	—	August 21, 2006	Kitt Peak	Spacewatch	MAS	740 m	MPC · JPL
255660	2006 QK_{29}	—	August 16, 2006	Siding Spring	SSS	·	1.4 km	MPC · JPL
255661	2006 QR_{30}	—	August 21, 2006	Palomar	NEAT	MAS	1.1 km	MPC · JPL
255662	2006 QL_{32}	—	August 20, 2006	Kitt Peak	Spacewatch	V	920 m	MPC · JPL
255663	2006 QO_{32}	—	August 21, 2006	Palomar	NEAT	V	900 m	MPC · JPL
255664	2006 QZ_{32}	—	August 22, 2006	Palomar	NEAT	·	2.0 km	MPC · JPL
255665	2006 QC_{33}	—	August 23, 2006	Socorro	LINEAR	·	2.0 km	MPC · JPL
255666	2006 QN_{34}	—	August 21, 2006	Socorro	LINEAR	·	1.6 km	MPC · JPL
255667	2006 QM_{35}	—	August 17, 2006	Palomar	NEAT	NYS	1.4 km	MPC · JPL
255668	2006 QC_{36}	—	August 19, 2006	Palomar	NEAT	·	1.9 km	MPC · JPL
255669	2006 QR_{40}	—	August 16, 2006	Siding Spring	SSS	V	920 m	MPC · JPL
255670	2006 QL_{41}	—	August 17, 2006	Palomar	NEAT	V	710 m	MPC · JPL
255671	2006 QZ_{41}	—	August 17, 2006	Palomar	NEAT	·	1.5 km	MPC · JPL
255672	2006 QK_{42}	—	August 17, 2006	Palomar	NEAT	NYS	1.7 km	MPC · JPL
255673	2006 QQ_{43}	—	August 18, 2006	Kitt Peak	Spacewatch	MAS	1.0 km	MPC · JPL
255674	2006 QQ_{44}	—	August 19, 2006	Anderson Mesa	LONEOS	NYS	1.7 km	MPC · JPL
255675	2006 QS_{45}	—	August 19, 2006	Anderson Mesa	LONEOS	EUN	1.8 km	MPC · JPL
255676	2006 QB_{47}	—	August 20, 2006	Palomar	NEAT	·	1.3 km	MPC · JPL
255677	2006 QU_{47}	—	August 21, 2006	Socorro	LINEAR	·	1.2 km	MPC · JPL
255678	2006 QQ_{48}	—	August 21, 2006	Palomar	NEAT	·	1.2 km	MPC · JPL
255679	2006 QF_{49}	—	August 21, 2006	Palomar	NEAT	·	1.4 km	MPC · JPL
255680	2006 QL_{49}	—	August 21, 2006	Palomar	NEAT	·	1.6 km	MPC · JPL
255681	2006 QN_{50}	—	August 22, 2006	Palomar	NEAT	NYS	1.5 km	MPC · JPL
255682	2006 QK_{51}	—	August 23, 2006	Palomar	NEAT	·	1.9 km	MPC · JPL
255683	2006 QZ_{51}	—	August 23, 2006	Palomar	NEAT	·	1.6 km	MPC · JPL
255684	2006 QF_{53}	—	August 23, 2006	Palomar	NEAT	NYS	1.5 km	MPC · JPL
255685	2006 QO_{53}	—	August 16, 2006	Siding Spring	SSS	·	1.9 km	MPC · JPL
255686	2006 QM_{55}	—	August 21, 2006	Socorro	LINEAR	NYS	1.3 km	MPC · JPL
255687	2006 QS_{58}	—	August 19, 2006	Palomar	NEAT	V	940 m	MPC · JPL
255688	2006 QJ_{59}	—	August 19, 2006	Anderson Mesa	LONEOS	MAS	960 m	MPC · JPL
255689	2006 QL_{60}	—	August 20, 2006	Palomar	NEAT	NYS	1.3 km	MPC · JPL
255690	2006 QT_{60}	—	August 21, 2006	Palomar	NEAT	·	1.4 km	MPC · JPL
255691	2006 QD_{61}	—	August 21, 2006	Palomar	NEAT	·	1.8 km	MPC · JPL
255692	2006 QZ_{61}	—	August 22, 2006	Palomar	NEAT	MAS	860 m	MPC · JPL
255693	2006 QP_{62}	—	August 23, 2006	Socorro	LINEAR	·	1.8 km	MPC · JPL
255694	2006 QU_{63}	—	August 24, 2006	Palomar	NEAT	·	1.5 km	MPC · JPL
255695	2006 QZ_{65}	—	August 25, 2006	Hibiscus	S. F. Hönig	·	1.6 km	MPC · JPL
255696	2006 QM_{66}	—	August 21, 2006	Socorro	LINEAR	·	1.6 km	MPC · JPL
255697	2006 QG_{81}	—	August 24, 2006	Palomar	NEAT	·	3.1 km	MPC · JPL
255698	2006 QC_{82}	—	August 24, 2006	Palomar	NEAT	·	1.7 km	MPC · JPL
255699	2006 QE_{84}	—	August 27, 2006	Kitt Peak	Spacewatch	NYS	1.4 km	MPC · JPL
255700	2006 QY_{86}	—	August 27, 2006	Kitt Peak	Spacewatch	NYS	1.2 km	MPC · JPL

== 255701–255800 ==
back to top

Designation			Discovery			Properties		Ref
Permanent	Provisional	Named after	Date	Site	Discoverer(s)	Category	Diam.	Ref
255701	2006 QK_{88}	—	August 27, 2006	Kitt Peak	Spacewatch	·	1.3 km	MPC · JPL
255702	2006 QO_{88}	—	August 27, 2006	Kitt Peak	Spacewatch	·	1.4 km	MPC · JPL
255703 Stetson	2006 QN_{90}	Stetson	August 25, 2006	Mauna Kea	D. D. Balam	·	1.4 km	MPC · JPL
255704	2006 QJ_{93}	—	August 16, 2006	Palomar	NEAT	V	810 m	MPC · JPL
255705	2006 QO_{93}	—	August 16, 2006	Palomar	NEAT	·	3.1 km	MPC · JPL
255706	2006 QL_{94}	—	August 16, 2006	Palomar	NEAT	NYS	1.3 km	MPC · JPL
255707	2006 QH_{97}	—	August 19, 2006	Kitt Peak	Spacewatch	NYS	1.4 km	MPC · JPL
255708	2006 QP_{99}	—	August 23, 2006	Palomar	NEAT	·	2.0 km	MPC · JPL
255709	2006 QD_{101}	—	August 26, 2006	Siding Spring	SSS	·	1.6 km	MPC · JPL
255710	2006 QL_{104}	—	August 28, 2006	Catalina	CSS	NYS	1.9 km	MPC · JPL
255711	2006 QR_{104}	—	August 28, 2006	Socorro	LINEAR	·	4.1 km	MPC · JPL
255712	2006 QE_{105}	—	August 28, 2006	Catalina	CSS	·	1.2 km	MPC · JPL
255713	2006 QP_{108}	—	August 28, 2006	Catalina	CSS	·	1.3 km	MPC · JPL
255714	2006 QS_{114}	—	August 27, 2006	Anderson Mesa	LONEOS	V	1.1 km	MPC · JPL
255715	2006 QK_{117}	—	August 27, 2006	Anderson Mesa	LONEOS	·	1.6 km	MPC · JPL
255716	2006 QK_{119}	—	August 28, 2006	Catalina	CSS	NYS	1.4 km	MPC · JPL
255717	2006 QH_{120}	—	August 29, 2006	Catalina	CSS	·	1.8 km	MPC · JPL
255718	2006 QJ_{120}	—	August 29, 2006	Catalina	CSS	·	1.6 km	MPC · JPL
255719	2006 QT_{120}	—	August 29, 2006	Catalina	CSS	·	1.7 km	MPC · JPL
255720	2006 QM_{121}	—	August 29, 2006	Catalina	CSS	·	1.3 km	MPC · JPL
255721	2006 QF_{122}	—	August 29, 2006	Catalina	CSS	·	1.4 km	MPC · JPL
255722	2006 QY_{122}	—	August 29, 2006	Catalina	CSS	·	1.3 km	MPC · JPL
255723	2006 QK_{124}	—	August 16, 2006	Palomar	NEAT	NYS	1.3 km	MPC · JPL
255724	2006 QH_{125}	—	August 16, 2006	Palomar	NEAT	V	910 m	MPC · JPL
255725	2006 QM_{127}	—	August 16, 2006	Siding Spring	SSS	·	1.6 km	MPC · JPL
255726	2006 QW_{128}	—	August 17, 2006	Palomar	NEAT	·	1.8 km	MPC · JPL
255727	2006 QE_{129}	—	August 17, 2006	Palomar	NEAT	·	2.7 km	MPC · JPL
255728	2006 QH_{132}	—	August 22, 2006	Palomar	NEAT	·	2.0 km	MPC · JPL
255729	2006 QU_{132}	—	August 23, 2006	Socorro	LINEAR	NYS	1.7 km	MPC · JPL
255730	2006 QB_{133}	—	August 23, 2006	Palomar	NEAT	·	980 m	MPC · JPL
255731	2006 QO_{135}	—	August 28, 2006	Anderson Mesa	LONEOS	V	960 m	MPC · JPL
255732	2006 QS_{135}	—	August 28, 2006	Socorro	LINEAR	ERI	2.7 km	MPC · JPL
255733	2006 QJ_{136}	—	August 29, 2006	Anderson Mesa	LONEOS	DOR	4.1 km	MPC · JPL
255734	2006 QD_{138}	—	August 16, 2006	Palomar	NEAT	·	1.5 km	MPC · JPL
255735	2006 QG_{138}	—	August 16, 2006	Palomar	NEAT	·	1.6 km	MPC · JPL
255736	2006 QK_{138}	—	August 16, 2006	Palomar	NEAT	·	1.9 km	MPC · JPL
255737	2006 QA_{145}	—	August 28, 2006	Catalina	CSS	·	1.6 km	MPC · JPL
255738	2006 QW_{147}	—	August 18, 2006	Kitt Peak	Spacewatch	MAS	920 m	MPC · JPL
255739	2006 QJ_{148}	—	August 18, 2006	Kitt Peak	Spacewatch	·	1.6 km	MPC · JPL
255740	2006 QZ_{158}	—	August 19, 2006	Kitt Peak	Spacewatch	·	890 m	MPC · JPL
255741	2006 QA_{164}	—	August 29, 2006	Catalina	CSS	·	1.4 km	MPC · JPL
255742	2006 QC_{183}	—	August 21, 2006	Kitt Peak	Spacewatch	·	1.4 km	MPC · JPL
255743	2006 RV	—	September 4, 2006	Wrightwood	J. W. Young	·	2.3 km	MPC · JPL
255744	2006 RQ_{2}	—	September 12, 2006	Anderson Mesa	LONEOS	·	2.2 km	MPC · JPL
255745	2006 RU_{2}	—	September 12, 2006	Socorro	LINEAR	·	1.9 km	MPC · JPL
255746	2006 RC_{6}	—	September 14, 2006	Catalina	CSS	·	1.5 km	MPC · JPL
255747	2006 RS_{11}	—	September 12, 2006	Catalina	CSS	·	1.6 km	MPC · JPL
255748	2006 RA_{12}	—	September 13, 2006	Palomar	NEAT	NYS	1.4 km	MPC · JPL
255749	2006 RV_{16}	—	September 14, 2006	Catalina	CSS	·	1.4 km	MPC · JPL
255750	2006 RC_{18}	—	September 14, 2006	Palomar	NEAT	·	1.4 km	MPC · JPL
255751	2006 RO_{18}	—	September 14, 2006	Catalina	CSS	·	1.2 km	MPC · JPL
255752	2006 RR_{20}	—	September 15, 2006	Kitt Peak	Spacewatch	NYS	1.6 km	MPC · JPL
255753	2006 RO_{22}	—	September 14, 2006	Palomar	NEAT	·	1.8 km	MPC · JPL
255754	2006 RT_{27}	—	September 14, 2006	Palomar	NEAT	·	1.5 km	MPC · JPL
255755	2006 RX_{27}	—	September 14, 2006	Palomar	NEAT	BAR	1.7 km	MPC · JPL
255756	2006 RW_{28}	—	September 15, 2006	Kitt Peak	Spacewatch	·	2.6 km	MPC · JPL
255757	2006 RM_{36}	—	September 15, 2006	Socorro	LINEAR	·	2.0 km	MPC · JPL
255758	2006 RD_{41}	—	September 14, 2006	Catalina	CSS	NYS	1.6 km	MPC · JPL
255759	2006 RN_{41}	—	September 14, 2006	Catalina	CSS	·	710 m	MPC · JPL
255760	2006 RR_{41}	—	September 14, 2006	Kitt Peak	Spacewatch	NYS	1.5 km	MPC · JPL
255761	2006 RM_{42}	—	September 14, 2006	Kitt Peak	Spacewatch	·	1.3 km	MPC · JPL
255762	2006 RX_{42}	—	September 14, 2006	Kitt Peak	Spacewatch	KON	3.9 km	MPC · JPL
255763	2006 RE_{46}	—	September 14, 2006	Kitt Peak	Spacewatch	MAS	1.1 km	MPC · JPL
255764	2006 RW_{49}	—	September 14, 2006	Kitt Peak	Spacewatch	·	1.0 km	MPC · JPL
255765	2006 RK_{55}	—	September 14, 2006	Kitt Peak	Spacewatch	·	1.3 km	MPC · JPL
255766	2006 RZ_{55}	—	September 14, 2006	Kitt Peak	Spacewatch	ERI	2.4 km	MPC · JPL
255767	2006 RB_{57}	—	September 14, 2006	Catalina	CSS	·	1.8 km	MPC · JPL
255768	2006 RO_{58}	—	September 15, 2006	Kitt Peak	Spacewatch	(5)	1.5 km	MPC · JPL
255769	2006 RW_{58}	—	September 15, 2006	Kitt Peak	Spacewatch	NYS	1.9 km	MPC · JPL
255770	2006 RA_{59}	—	September 15, 2006	Kitt Peak	Spacewatch	·	1.7 km	MPC · JPL
255771	2006 RE_{65}	—	September 14, 2006	Palomar	NEAT	·	1.3 km	MPC · JPL
255772	2006 RK_{66}	—	September 14, 2006	Kitt Peak	Spacewatch	(5)	1.7 km	MPC · JPL
255773	2006 RD_{70}	—	September 15, 2006	Kitt Peak	Spacewatch	MAS	820 m	MPC · JPL
255774	2006 RZ_{75}	—	September 15, 2006	Kitt Peak	Spacewatch	(5)	1.2 km	MPC · JPL
255775	2006 RS_{82}	—	September 15, 2006	Kitt Peak	Spacewatch	MAS	820 m	MPC · JPL
255776	2006 RY_{83}	—	September 15, 2006	Kitt Peak	Spacewatch	·	1.3 km	MPC · JPL
255777	2006 RV_{86}	—	September 15, 2006	Kitt Peak	Spacewatch	NYS	1.2 km	MPC · JPL
255778	2006 RS_{87}	—	September 15, 2006	Kitt Peak	Spacewatch	RAF	880 m	MPC · JPL
255779	2006 RK_{88}	—	September 15, 2006	Kitt Peak	Spacewatch	MAR	1.1 km	MPC · JPL
255780	2006 RM_{88}	—	September 15, 2006	Kitt Peak	Spacewatch	·	1.6 km	MPC · JPL
255781	2006 RW_{92}	—	September 15, 2006	Kitt Peak	Spacewatch	·	1.5 km	MPC · JPL
255782	2006 RH_{95}	—	September 15, 2006	Kitt Peak	Spacewatch	·	990 m	MPC · JPL
255783	2006 RX_{95}	—	September 15, 2006	Kitt Peak	Spacewatch	·	1.4 km	MPC · JPL
255784	2006 RJ_{96}	—	September 15, 2006	Kitt Peak	Spacewatch	·	1.2 km	MPC · JPL
255785	2006 RE_{97}	—	September 15, 2006	Kitt Peak	Spacewatch	·	1.8 km	MPC · JPL
255786	2006 RW_{98}	—	September 14, 2006	Kitt Peak	Spacewatch	·	2.0 km	MPC · JPL
255787	2006 RF_{100}	—	September 14, 2006	Catalina	CSS	·	1.7 km	MPC · JPL
255788	2006 RK_{100}	—	September 14, 2006	Catalina	CSS	·	1.8 km	MPC · JPL
255789	2006 RY_{100}	—	September 14, 2006	Catalina	CSS	V	980 m	MPC · JPL
255790	2006 SQ	—	September 16, 2006	Catalina	CSS	·	2.1 km	MPC · JPL
255791	2006 SF_{3}	—	September 16, 2006	Anderson Mesa	LONEOS	·	1.6 km	MPC · JPL
255792	2006 ST_{7}	—	September 18, 2006	Hibiscus	S. F. Hönig	ERI	2.1 km	MPC · JPL
255793	2006 SB_{8}	—	September 16, 2006	Catalina	CSS	·	1.7 km	MPC · JPL
255794	2006 SE_{8}	—	September 16, 2006	Catalina	CSS	·	2.4 km	MPC · JPL
255795	2006 SH_{8}	—	September 16, 2006	Anderson Mesa	LONEOS	PHO	1.6 km	MPC · JPL
255796	2006 SY_{10}	—	September 16, 2006	Kitt Peak	Spacewatch	·	1.7 km	MPC · JPL
255797	2006 SN_{11}	—	September 16, 2006	Socorro	LINEAR	·	1.7 km	MPC · JPL
255798	2006 SG_{13}	—	September 17, 2006	Socorro	LINEAR	·	2.3 km	MPC · JPL
255799	2006 ST_{14}	—	September 17, 2006	Catalina	CSS	·	1.6 km	MPC · JPL
255800	2006 SN_{15}	—	September 17, 2006	Catalina	CSS	WIT	1.3 km	MPC · JPL

== 255801–255900 ==
back to top

Designation			Discovery			Properties		Ref
Permanent	Provisional	Named after	Date	Site	Discoverer(s)	Category	Diam.	Ref
255801	2006 SD_{19}	—	September 17, 2006	Kitt Peak	Spacewatch	·	1.6 km	MPC · JPL
255802	2006 SZ_{21}	—	September 17, 2006	Catalina	CSS	·	1.3 km	MPC · JPL
255803	2006 SL_{22}	—	September 17, 2006	Anderson Mesa	LONEOS	·	1.8 km	MPC · JPL
255804	2006 SV_{24}	—	September 16, 2006	Catalina	CSS	·	1.5 km	MPC · JPL
255805	2006 SM_{25}	—	September 16, 2006	Anderson Mesa	LONEOS	SUL	2.7 km	MPC · JPL
255806	2006 SD_{33}	—	September 17, 2006	Kitt Peak	Spacewatch	·	1.5 km	MPC · JPL
255807	2006 SO_{34}	—	September 17, 2006	Catalina	CSS	·	1.7 km	MPC · JPL
255808	2006 SM_{35}	—	September 17, 2006	Kitt Peak	Spacewatch	·	1.6 km	MPC · JPL
255809	2006 SN_{40}	—	September 18, 2006	Catalina	CSS	NYS	1.6 km	MPC · JPL
255810	2006 SC_{42}	—	September 18, 2006	Anderson Mesa	LONEOS	·	1.3 km	MPC · JPL
255811	2006 SB_{46}	—	September 18, 2006	Anderson Mesa	LONEOS	CLA	2.1 km	MPC · JPL
255812	2006 SE_{46}	—	September 18, 2006	Vail-Jarnac	Jarnac	V	940 m	MPC · JPL
255813	2006 SO_{48}	—	September 16, 2006	Catalina	CSS	JUN	1.2 km	MPC · JPL
255814	2006 SD_{50}	—	September 19, 2006	La Sagra	OAM	·	1.4 km	MPC · JPL
255815	2006 SP_{51}	—	September 17, 2006	Anderson Mesa	LONEOS	·	1.9 km	MPC · JPL
255816	2006 SN_{52}	—	September 19, 2006	Catalina	CSS	·	1.2 km	MPC · JPL
255817	2006 SQ_{54}	—	September 18, 2006	Catalina	CSS	NYS	1.6 km	MPC · JPL
255818	2006 SZ_{54}	—	September 18, 2006	Catalina	CSS	·	2.0 km	MPC · JPL
255819	2006 SE_{57}	—	September 21, 2006	Ottmarsheim	Ottmarsheim	·	1.4 km	MPC · JPL
255820	2006 SP_{57}	—	September 17, 2006	Catalina	CSS	V	900 m	MPC · JPL
255821	2006 SB_{68}	—	September 19, 2006	Kitt Peak	Spacewatch	·	1.8 km	MPC · JPL
255822	2006 SO_{70}	—	September 19, 2006	Kitt Peak	Spacewatch	·	1.0 km	MPC · JPL
255823	2006 SB_{71}	—	September 19, 2006	Kitt Peak	Spacewatch	·	1.7 km	MPC · JPL
255824	2006 SF_{71}	—	September 19, 2006	Kitt Peak	Spacewatch	·	1.1 km	MPC · JPL
255825	2006 SL_{72}	—	September 19, 2006	Kitt Peak	Spacewatch	·	1.3 km	MPC · JPL
255826	2006 SB_{76}	—	September 19, 2006	Kitt Peak	Spacewatch	CLA	1.9 km	MPC · JPL
255827	2006 SZ_{85}	—	September 18, 2006	Kitt Peak	Spacewatch	·	1.5 km	MPC · JPL
255828	2006 SC_{86}	—	September 18, 2006	Kitt Peak	Spacewatch	MAS · fast?	670 m	MPC · JPL
255829	2006 ST_{87}	—	September 18, 2006	Kitt Peak	Spacewatch	·	1.7 km	MPC · JPL
255830	2006 SY_{89}	—	September 18, 2006	Kitt Peak	Spacewatch	MAR	1.1 km	MPC · JPL
255831	2006 SO_{90}	—	September 18, 2006	Kitt Peak	Spacewatch	·	1.8 km	MPC · JPL
255832	2006 SH_{95}	—	September 18, 2006	Kitt Peak	Spacewatch	·	1.5 km	MPC · JPL
255833	2006 SK_{95}	—	September 18, 2006	Kitt Peak	Spacewatch	·	950 m	MPC · JPL
255834	2006 SP_{96}	—	September 18, 2006	Kitt Peak	Spacewatch	NYS	1.4 km	MPC · JPL
255835	2006 SK_{98}	—	September 18, 2006	Kitt Peak	Spacewatch	·	1.3 km	MPC · JPL
255836	2006 SC_{100}	—	September 18, 2006	Kitt Peak	Spacewatch	·	2.4 km	MPC · JPL
255837	2006 SS_{103}	—	September 19, 2006	Kitt Peak	Spacewatch	·	1.6 km	MPC · JPL
255838	2006 SE_{104}	—	September 19, 2006	Kitt Peak	Spacewatch	NYS	1.3 km	MPC · JPL
255839	2006 SN_{108}	—	September 19, 2006	Kitt Peak	Spacewatch	·	1.6 km	MPC · JPL
255840	2006 SR_{109}	—	September 19, 2006	Kitt Peak	Spacewatch	·	2.3 km	MPC · JPL
255841	2006 SM_{110}	—	September 20, 2006	Catalina	CSS	·	2.1 km	MPC · JPL
255842	2006 SG_{111}	—	September 22, 2006	Kitt Peak	Spacewatch	·	1.4 km	MPC · JPL
255843	2006 SJ_{116}	—	September 24, 2006	Kitt Peak	Spacewatch	·	1.1 km	MPC · JPL
255844	2006 SH_{117}	—	September 24, 2006	Kitt Peak	Spacewatch	·	1.7 km	MPC · JPL
255845	2006 SM_{117}	—	September 24, 2006	Kitt Peak	Spacewatch	·	1.3 km	MPC · JPL
255846	2006 SQ_{121}	—	September 18, 2006	Catalina	CSS	·	2.0 km	MPC · JPL
255847	2006 SA_{136}	—	September 20, 2006	Catalina	CSS	·	1.5 km	MPC · JPL
255848	2006 SH_{138}	—	September 20, 2006	Anderson Mesa	LONEOS	·	2.6 km	MPC · JPL
255849	2006 SS_{142}	—	September 19, 2006	Catalina	CSS	NYS	1.2 km	MPC · JPL
255850	2006 SO_{143}	—	September 19, 2006	Kitt Peak	Spacewatch	·	1.3 km	MPC · JPL
255851	2006 SP_{151}	—	September 19, 2006	Kitt Peak	Spacewatch	·	1.7 km	MPC · JPL
255852	2006 SS_{151}	—	September 19, 2006	Kitt Peak	Spacewatch	·	1.3 km	MPC · JPL
255853	2006 SQ_{152}	—	September 19, 2006	Kitt Peak	Spacewatch	·	1.4 km	MPC · JPL
255854	2006 SK_{153}	—	September 20, 2006	Catalina	CSS	·	1.0 km	MPC · JPL
255855	2006 SF_{154}	—	September 20, 2006	Palomar	NEAT	·	1.8 km	MPC · JPL
255856	2006 SJ_{154}	—	September 20, 2006	Palomar	NEAT	·	1.6 km	MPC · JPL
255857	2006 SC_{160}	—	September 23, 2006	Kitt Peak	Spacewatch	·	1.8 km	MPC · JPL
255858	2006 SF_{160}	—	September 23, 2006	Kitt Peak	Spacewatch	NYS	1.4 km	MPC · JPL
255859	2006 SL_{163}	—	September 24, 2006	Kitt Peak	Spacewatch	·	1.4 km	MPC · JPL
255860	2006 SV_{165}	—	September 25, 2006	Kitt Peak	Spacewatch	·	3.4 km	MPC · JPL
255861	2006 ST_{169}	—	September 25, 2006	Kitt Peak	Spacewatch	ADE	3.5 km	MPC · JPL
255862	2006 SG_{171}	—	September 25, 2006	Kitt Peak	Spacewatch	NYS	1.3 km	MPC · JPL
255863	2006 SJ_{172}	—	September 25, 2006	Kitt Peak	Spacewatch	V	780 m	MPC · JPL
255864	2006 SB_{175}	—	September 25, 2006	Kitt Peak	Spacewatch	·	1.3 km	MPC · JPL
255865	2006 SL_{182}	—	September 25, 2006	Kitt Peak	Spacewatch	·	1.2 km	MPC · JPL
255866	2006 SW_{184}	—	September 25, 2006	Mount Lemmon	Mount Lemmon Survey	·	1.3 km	MPC · JPL
255867	2006 SA_{186}	—	September 25, 2006	Mount Lemmon	Mount Lemmon Survey	·	1.3 km	MPC · JPL
255868	2006 SW_{187}	—	September 26, 2006	Kitt Peak	Spacewatch	·	1.6 km	MPC · JPL
255869	2006 SS_{196}	—	September 26, 2006	Kitt Peak	Spacewatch	·	1.6 km	MPC · JPL
255870	2006 SW_{196}	—	September 26, 2006	Kitt Peak	Spacewatch	(5)	1.6 km	MPC · JPL
255871	2006 SA_{203}	—	September 25, 2006	Mount Lemmon	Mount Lemmon Survey	·	1.1 km	MPC · JPL
255872	2006 SS_{208}	—	September 26, 2006	Socorro	LINEAR	·	1.6 km	MPC · JPL
255873	2006 SL_{211}	—	September 26, 2006	Catalina	CSS	RAF	1.6 km	MPC · JPL
255874	2006 SB_{215}	—	September 27, 2006	Mount Lemmon	Mount Lemmon Survey	·	2.9 km	MPC · JPL
255875	2006 SJ_{223}	—	September 25, 2006	Mount Lemmon	Mount Lemmon Survey	·	1.2 km	MPC · JPL
255876	2006 SN_{223}	—	September 25, 2006	Mount Lemmon	Mount Lemmon Survey	·	1.6 km	MPC · JPL
255877	2006 SS_{223}	—	September 25, 2006	Mount Lemmon	Mount Lemmon Survey	·	2.2 km	MPC · JPL
255878	2006 SQ_{239}	—	September 26, 2006	Kitt Peak	Spacewatch	MAS	880 m	MPC · JPL
255879	2006 SB_{241}	—	September 26, 2006	Kitt Peak	Spacewatch	MAS	850 m	MPC · JPL
255880	2006 SH_{250}	—	September 26, 2006	Kitt Peak	Spacewatch	V	790 m	MPC · JPL
255881	2006 SE_{254}	—	September 26, 2006	Mount Lemmon	Mount Lemmon Survey	·	1.4 km	MPC · JPL
255882	2006 SG_{259}	—	September 26, 2006	Kitt Peak	Spacewatch	·	1.3 km	MPC · JPL
255883	2006 SV_{259}	—	September 26, 2006	Mount Lemmon	Mount Lemmon Survey	NYS	1.6 km	MPC · JPL
255884	2006 SN_{262}	—	September 26, 2006	Mount Lemmon	Mount Lemmon Survey	·	2.5 km	MPC · JPL
255885	2006 SJ_{263}	—	September 26, 2006	Kitt Peak	Spacewatch	·	2.7 km	MPC · JPL
255886	2006 SX_{268}	—	September 26, 2006	Kitt Peak	Spacewatch	SUL	2.7 km	MPC · JPL
255887	2006 SS_{269}	—	September 26, 2006	Mount Lemmon	Mount Lemmon Survey	·	2.3 km	MPC · JPL
255888	2006 SD_{271}	—	September 27, 2006	Socorro	LINEAR	·	1.4 km	MPC · JPL
255889	2006 SG_{271}	—	September 27, 2006	Mount Lemmon	Mount Lemmon Survey	·	1.3 km	MPC · JPL
255890	2006 SD_{274}	—	September 27, 2006	Mount Lemmon	Mount Lemmon Survey	·	1.4 km	MPC · JPL
255891	2006 SS_{274}	—	September 27, 2006	Mount Lemmon	Mount Lemmon Survey	·	2.0 km	MPC · JPL
255892	2006 SL_{275}	—	September 27, 2006	Mount Lemmon	Mount Lemmon Survey	·	2.2 km	MPC · JPL
255893	2006 ST_{279}	—	September 28, 2006	Catalina	CSS	·	2.7 km	MPC · JPL
255894	2006 SK_{284}	—	September 27, 2006	Catalina	CSS	·	1.4 km	MPC · JPL
255895	2006 SN_{286}	—	September 19, 2006	Catalina	CSS	·	2.2 km	MPC · JPL
255896	2006 SA_{289}	—	September 26, 2006	Catalina	CSS	·	1.9 km	MPC · JPL
255897	2006 SY_{289}	—	September 27, 2006	Socorro	LINEAR	·	1.6 km	MPC · JPL
255898	2006 SK_{294}	—	September 25, 2006	Kitt Peak	Spacewatch	(5)	1.3 km	MPC · JPL
255899	2006 SP_{298}	—	September 25, 2006	Mount Lemmon	Mount Lemmon Survey	MAR	1.2 km	MPC · JPL
255900	2006 SR_{298}	—	September 25, 2006	Kitt Peak	Spacewatch	·	1.6 km	MPC · JPL

== 255901–256000 ==
back to top

Designation			Discovery			Properties		Ref
Permanent	Provisional	Named after	Date	Site	Discoverer(s)	Category	Diam.	Ref
255901	2006 SH_{306}	—	September 27, 2006	Socorro	LINEAR	·	1.3 km	MPC · JPL
255902	2006 SD_{308}	—	September 27, 2006	Kitt Peak	Spacewatch	HOF	2.7 km	MPC · JPL
255903	2006 SS_{315}	—	September 27, 2006	Kitt Peak	Spacewatch	·	1.6 km	MPC · JPL
255904	2006 SU_{316}	—	September 27, 2006	Kitt Peak	Spacewatch	(5)	1.0 km	MPC · JPL
255905	2006 SC_{323}	—	September 27, 2006	Kitt Peak	Spacewatch	·	1.3 km	MPC · JPL
255906	2006 SY_{325}	—	September 27, 2006	Kitt Peak	Spacewatch	(194) · slow	2.3 km	MPC · JPL
255907	2006 SE_{327}	—	September 27, 2006	Kitt Peak	Spacewatch	(5)	1.0 km	MPC · JPL
255908	2006 SC_{329}	—	September 27, 2006	Kitt Peak	Spacewatch	MAS	990 m	MPC · JPL
255909	2006 SN_{339}	—	September 28, 2006	Kitt Peak	Spacewatch	·	1.5 km	MPC · JPL
255910	2006 SK_{342}	—	September 28, 2006	Kitt Peak	Spacewatch	·	2.0 km	MPC · JPL
255911	2006 SS_{348}	—	September 28, 2006	Kitt Peak	Spacewatch	NYS	1.0 km	MPC · JPL
255912	2006 SA_{354}	—	September 30, 2006	Catalina	CSS	·	2.0 km	MPC · JPL
255913	2006 SE_{354}	—	September 30, 2006	Catalina	CSS	·	1.3 km	MPC · JPL
255914	2006 SY_{356}	—	September 30, 2006	Catalina	CSS	EUN	1.3 km	MPC · JPL
255915	2006 SW_{357}	—	September 30, 2006	Mount Lemmon	Mount Lemmon Survey	·	1.5 km	MPC · JPL
255916	2006 SD_{358}	—	September 30, 2006	Mount Lemmon	Mount Lemmon Survey	·	1.0 km	MPC · JPL
255917	2006 SE_{359}	—	September 30, 2006	Catalina	CSS	·	1.6 km	MPC · JPL
255918	2006 SX_{361}	—	September 30, 2006	Mount Lemmon	Mount Lemmon Survey	(5)	1.2 km	MPC · JPL
255919	2006 SB_{363}	—	September 30, 2006	Catalina	CSS	·	2.9 km	MPC · JPL
255920	2006 SF_{365}	—	September 30, 2006	Catalina	CSS	·	1.7 km	MPC · JPL
255921	2006 SV_{365}	—	September 30, 2006	Mount Lemmon	Mount Lemmon Survey	·	1.2 km	MPC · JPL
255922	2006 SU_{366}	—	September 16, 2006	Catalina	CSS	PHO	2.9 km	MPC · JPL
255923	2006 SE_{367}	—	September 25, 2006	Catalina	CSS	·	2.0 km	MPC · JPL
255924	2006 SM_{388}	—	September 30, 2006	Apache Point	A. C. Becker	·	2.4 km	MPC · JPL
255925	2006 SF_{390}	—	September 30, 2006	Apache Point	A. C. Becker	·	5.9 km	MPC · JPL
255926	2006 SY_{390}	—	September 17, 2006	Catalina	CSS	·	3.0 km	MPC · JPL
255927	2006 SO_{391}	—	September 18, 2006	Catalina	CSS	EUN	1.7 km	MPC · JPL
255928	2006 SN_{392}	—	September 26, 2006	Mount Lemmon	Mount Lemmon Survey	·	1.1 km	MPC · JPL
255929	2006 SM_{393}	—	September 28, 2006	Mount Lemmon	Mount Lemmon Survey	·	2.0 km	MPC · JPL
255930	2006 SD_{397}	—	September 19, 2006	Catalina	CSS	·	2.2 km	MPC · JPL
255931	2006 SW_{400}	—	September 25, 2006	Mount Lemmon	Mount Lemmon Survey	·	1.3 km	MPC · JPL
255932	2006 SA_{402}	—	September 30, 2006	Mount Lemmon	Mount Lemmon Survey	·	2.5 km	MPC · JPL
255933	2006 SV_{406}	—	September 19, 2006	Catalina	CSS	·	2.8 km	MPC · JPL
255934	2006 SU_{408}	—	September 19, 2006	Catalina	CSS	·	3.5 km	MPC · JPL
255935	2006 SZ_{412}	—	September 17, 2006	Catalina	CSS	·	3.2 km	MPC · JPL
255936	2006 TP_{1}	—	October 1, 2006	Kitt Peak	Spacewatch	·	1.7 km	MPC · JPL
255937	2006 TD_{4}	—	October 2, 2006	Mount Lemmon	Mount Lemmon Survey	·	1.3 km	MPC · JPL
255938	2006 TB_{8}	—	October 12, 2006	Calvin-Rehoboth	L. A. Molnar	·	1.3 km	MPC · JPL
255939	2006 TT_{9}	—	October 13, 2006	Calvin-Rehoboth	L. A. Molnar	·	1.5 km	MPC · JPL
255940 Maylis	2006 TZ_{9}	Maylis	October 14, 2006	Dax	C. Rinner	·	1.5 km	MPC · JPL
255941	2006 TT_{10}	—	October 3, 2006	Kitt Peak	Spacewatch	·	3.1 km	MPC · JPL
255942	2006 TT_{11}	—	October 15, 2006	Kitt Peak	Spacewatch	·	2.6 km	MPC · JPL
255943	2006 TT_{12}	—	October 10, 2006	Palomar	NEAT	·	2.6 km	MPC · JPL
255944	2006 TM_{15}	—	October 11, 2006	Kitt Peak	Spacewatch	MAR	1.4 km	MPC · JPL
255945	2006 TZ_{16}	—	October 11, 2006	Kitt Peak	Spacewatch	·	1.5 km	MPC · JPL
255946	2006 TA_{17}	—	October 11, 2006	Kitt Peak	Spacewatch	·	2.0 km	MPC · JPL
255947	2006 TG_{17}	—	October 11, 2006	Kitt Peak	Spacewatch	(5)	1.7 km	MPC · JPL
255948	2006 TG_{22}	—	October 11, 2006	Kitt Peak	Spacewatch	(5)	1.6 km	MPC · JPL
255949	2006 TU_{22}	—	October 11, 2006	Kitt Peak	Spacewatch	·	1.7 km	MPC · JPL
255950	2006 TN_{23}	—	October 11, 2006	Kitt Peak	Spacewatch	·	1.5 km	MPC · JPL
255951	2006 TY_{26}	—	October 12, 2006	Kitt Peak	Spacewatch	·	1.9 km	MPC · JPL
255952	2006 TD_{27}	—	October 12, 2006	Kitt Peak	Spacewatch	·	2.2 km	MPC · JPL
255953	2006 TF_{27}	—	October 12, 2006	Kitt Peak	Spacewatch	·	1.5 km	MPC · JPL
255954	2006 TT_{27}	—	October 12, 2006	Kitt Peak	Spacewatch	·	2.4 km	MPC · JPL
255955	2006 TD_{28}	—	October 12, 2006	Kitt Peak	Spacewatch	·	1.3 km	MPC · JPL
255956	2006 TP_{28}	—	October 12, 2006	Kitt Peak	Spacewatch	(5)	1.8 km	MPC · JPL
255957	2006 TQ_{28}	—	October 12, 2006	Kitt Peak	Spacewatch	(5)	1.7 km	MPC · JPL
255958	2006 TK_{29}	—	October 12, 2006	Kitt Peak	Spacewatch	·	2.0 km	MPC · JPL
255959	2006 TP_{34}	—	October 12, 2006	Kitt Peak	Spacewatch	CLA	2.4 km	MPC · JPL
255960	2006 TC_{35}	—	October 12, 2006	Kitt Peak	Spacewatch	·	1.4 km	MPC · JPL
255961	2006 TB_{36}	—	October 12, 2006	Kitt Peak	Spacewatch	·	1.5 km	MPC · JPL
255962	2006 TH_{37}	—	October 12, 2006	Kitt Peak	Spacewatch	(5)	1.4 km	MPC · JPL
255963	2006 TV_{38}	—	October 12, 2006	Kitt Peak	Spacewatch	(5)	1.5 km	MPC · JPL
255964	2006 TZ_{39}	—	October 12, 2006	Kitt Peak	Spacewatch	(21344)	1.8 km	MPC · JPL
255965	2006 TG_{40}	—	October 12, 2006	Kitt Peak	Spacewatch	·	1.9 km	MPC · JPL
255966	2006 TA_{44}	—	October 12, 2006	Kitt Peak	Spacewatch	·	2.0 km	MPC · JPL
255967	2006 TE_{44}	—	October 12, 2006	Kitt Peak	Spacewatch	·	1.7 km	MPC · JPL
255968	2006 TR_{44}	—	October 12, 2006	Kitt Peak	Spacewatch	·	1.6 km	MPC · JPL
255969	2006 TV_{44}	—	October 12, 2006	Kitt Peak	Spacewatch	·	1.6 km	MPC · JPL
255970	2006 TG_{46}	—	October 12, 2006	Kitt Peak	Spacewatch	·	2.4 km	MPC · JPL
255971	2006 TL_{47}	—	October 12, 2006	Kitt Peak	Spacewatch	·	2.4 km	MPC · JPL
255972	2006 TE_{49}	—	October 12, 2006	Palomar	NEAT	·	1.9 km	MPC · JPL
255973	2006 TV_{50}	—	October 12, 2006	Kitt Peak	Spacewatch	·	2.1 km	MPC · JPL
255974	2006 TH_{51}	—	October 12, 2006	Kitt Peak	Spacewatch	·	2.1 km	MPC · JPL
255975	2006 TQ_{52}	—	October 12, 2006	Kitt Peak	Spacewatch	·	1.2 km	MPC · JPL
255976	2006 TF_{53}	—	October 12, 2006	Kitt Peak	Spacewatch	·	2.0 km	MPC · JPL
255977	2006 TC_{64}	—	October 10, 2006	Palomar	NEAT	EUN	1.7 km	MPC · JPL
255978	2006 TE_{70}	—	October 11, 2006	Palomar	NEAT	·	1.9 km	MPC · JPL
255979	2006 TU_{70}	—	October 11, 2006	Palomar	NEAT	·	1.7 km	MPC · JPL
255980	2006 TE_{71}	—	October 11, 2006	Palomar	NEAT	·	1.4 km	MPC · JPL
255981	2006 TJ_{75}	—	October 11, 2006	Palomar	NEAT	HIL · 3:2	7.4 km	MPC · JPL
255982	2006 TF_{78}	—	October 12, 2006	Palomar	NEAT	·	2.3 km	MPC · JPL
255983	2006 TY_{78}	—	October 12, 2006	Kitt Peak	Spacewatch	·	1.5 km	MPC · JPL
255984	2006 TB_{79}	—	October 12, 2006	Kitt Peak	Spacewatch	EUN	2.0 km	MPC · JPL
255985	2006 TF_{79}	—	October 12, 2006	Kitt Peak	Spacewatch	·	1.6 km	MPC · JPL
255986	2006 TL_{82}	—	October 13, 2006	Kitt Peak	Spacewatch	(5)	1.3 km	MPC · JPL
255987	2006 TT_{85}	—	October 13, 2006	Kitt Peak	Spacewatch	·	1.2 km	MPC · JPL
255988	2006 TP_{91}	—	October 13, 2006	Kitt Peak	Spacewatch	RAF	1.5 km	MPC · JPL
255989 Dengyushian	2006 TU_{94}	Dengyushian	October 15, 2006	Lulin	Lin, C.-S., Q. Ye	·	1.9 km	MPC · JPL
255990	2006 TG_{98}	—	October 15, 2006	Kitt Peak	Spacewatch	·	1.8 km	MPC · JPL
255991	2006 TL_{102}	—	October 15, 2006	Kitt Peak	Spacewatch	·	1.7 km	MPC · JPL
255992	2006 TN_{102}	—	October 15, 2006	Kitt Peak	Spacewatch	·	2.4 km	MPC · JPL
255993	2006 TE_{104}	—	October 15, 2006	Kitt Peak	Spacewatch	·	1.4 km	MPC · JPL
255994	2006 TL_{105}	—	October 15, 2006	Kitt Peak	Spacewatch	(5)	1.4 km	MPC · JPL
255995	2006 TY_{105}	—	October 12, 2006	Palomar	NEAT	·	2.5 km	MPC · JPL
255996	2006 TC_{106}	—	October 15, 2006	Kitt Peak	Spacewatch	·	1.8 km	MPC · JPL
255997	2006 TS_{106}	—	October 15, 2006	Catalina	CSS	·	1.2 km	MPC · JPL
255998	2006 TO_{109}	—	October 4, 2006	Mount Lemmon	Mount Lemmon Survey	·	2.5 km	MPC · JPL
255999	2006 TJ_{110}	—	October 13, 2006	Kitt Peak	Spacewatch	·	1.6 km	MPC · JPL
256000	2006 TO_{110}	—	October 13, 2006	Kitt Peak	Spacewatch	·	1.7 km	MPC · JPL

back to top

== See also ==
- Meanings of minor-planet names: 255001–256000
