= List of International Society for Magnetic Resonance in Medicine gold medal winners =

The ISMRM Gold Medal is the highest honor awarded by the International Society for Magnetic Resonance in Medicine, recognizing individuals who have made major contributions to the development of magnetic resonance techniques in medicine and biology. Recipients are selected by a committee of peers based on the originality and impact of their work in magnetic resonance imaging (MRI) and spectroscopy (MRS). Past awardees include Robert S. Balaban (1994), Peter J. Basser (2008), Zaver M. Bhujwalla (2019), and Peter A. Bandettini (2020).

Name	Year(s)	Notes
Paul Christian Lauterbur (1929–2007) ★	1982, 1988	Awarded by both predecessor societies, SMRM and SMRI
Richard Robert Ernst (1933–2021) ✰	1983	
Waldo Stephen Hinshaw	1983	
Peter Mansfield (1933–2017) ★	1983, 1994	Awarded by both predecessor societies, SMRM and SMRI
George K. Radda (né György Károly Radda; 1936–2024)	1984	
Robert G. Shulman	1984	
David I. Hoult	1985	
Lawrence E. Crooks	1986	
Graeme Bydder	1987, 1992	Awarded by both predecessor societies, SMRM and SMRI
Britton Chance	1988	
James ("Jim") Hutchison, PhD (1941–2018)	1988	
Paul A. Bottomley	1989	
William G. Bradley, Jr., MD, PhD (1948–2017)	1989, 1993	Awarded by both predecessor societies, SMRM and SMRI
William A. Edelstein	1990	
Seymour Hillel Koenig (1927–2018)	1990	[wikidata]
Brian Stewart Worthington (1938–2007)	1990	
Axel Haase [wikidata]	1991	
Jens Frahm	1991	
Michael T. Modic	1991	(see Modic changes)
Joseph J. H. Ackerman	1992	
Thomas J. Brady	1992	
Michael Nicholas Brant-Zawadzki, MD, FACR	1993	
Charles L. Dumoulin, PhD	1993	
Gerhard Laub	1993	
Robert Stephen Balaban	1994	
Jürgen Hennig	1994	
Robert R. Edelman	1994	
Richard L. Ehman	1995	[wikidata]
Seiji Ogawa	1995	
Brian Ross	1995	
Albert Macovski	1997	
Bruce R. Rosen	1997	
Francis W. Smith	1990	
Kamil Ugurbil	1996	
R. Mark Henkelman	1998	
Ian Robert Young (1932–2019)	1988, 1989	Awarded by both predecessor societies, SMRM and SMRI
James S. Hyde	1999	
Marjo van der Knaap	1999	
Jacob ("Jaap") Valk, MD, PhD (1929–2024)	1999	Collaborated with Marjo van der Knaap
Gary H. Glover	2000	
Michael E. Moseley	2001	
Denis Le Bihan	2001	
Alan P. Koretsky	2002	[wikidata]
Stephen J. Riederer	2002	
Ferenc A. Jolesz	2003	
Hedvig Hricak	2003	
John C. Gore	2004	
E. Mark Haacke	2004	
Andrew A. Maudsley	2005	
Martin R. Prince	2005	
Klaas P. Prüssmann	2006	
Daniel K. Sodickson	2006	
Michael Garwood	2007	
Peter C.M. van Zijl	2007	
Peter J. Basser	2008	
Peter Bernard Roemer	2009	
John Schenck	2009	
Robert I. Grossman	2010	
John R. Griffiths	2011	
Jerry D. Glickson	2011	
Clifford R. Jack	2012	
John Mark Pauly	2012	
Mitchell D. Schnall	2013	
Chien Ho	2013	
William Thomas (Tom) Dixon, PhD (1945–1922)	2013	
Robert Martin Judd	2014	
Raymond J. Kim	2014	
Jeff W. M. Bulte	2014	[wikidata]
Christiane K. Kuhl	2015	
A. Dean Sherry	2015	
Erwin Louis Hahn (1921–2016)	2016	
Sharmila Majumdar	2016	
Gil Navon	2016	
Mark Griswold	2017	
Felix Werner Wehrli	2017	[wikidata]
Susumu Mori	2018	
Dwight G. Nishimura	2018	
Vivian S. Lee	2019	
Sarah J. Nelson (1954–2019)	2019	Deceased
Zaver M. Bhujwalla	2019	
Kaori Togashi	2020	
Robert Turner	2020	
Peter A. Bandettini	2020	
Kenneth K. Kwong	2020	
Frederik Barkhof	2021	
Douglas L. Rothman	2021	
Clare M.C. Tempany-Afdhal	2021	
Nola M. Hylton	2022	
Zhi-Pei Liang	2022	
John P. Mugler III	2022	
Hollis G. Potter	2022	
Robert Todd Constable	2023	
Garry E. Gold	2023	
Petra Susan Hüppi	2023	
Leon Axel, M.D., Ph.D.	2024	
Seong-Gi Kim, Ph.D.	2024	
Yi Wang, Ph.D.	2024	
John A. Detre	2025	
Michael Lustig	2025	
Lawrence L. Wald	2025	

✰ – 1991 Nobel Prize in Chemistry
★ – 2003 Nobel Prize in Physiology or Medicine

== See also ==
- Günther Laukien Prize, presented at the Experimental Nuclear Magnetic Resonance Conference "to recognize recent cutting-edge experimental NMR research with a high probability of enabling beneficial new applications."
