= John Pauly =

John Pauly may refer to:

- John Pauly (engineer), professor of engineering
- John W. Pauly (1923–2013), United States Air Force general
- John J. Pauly, academic administrator
- Jean Samuel Pauly (1766–c. 1821), Swiss inventor and gunsmith, also known as John Pauly
