= Jürgen Hennig =

German chemist and medical physicist (born 1951)

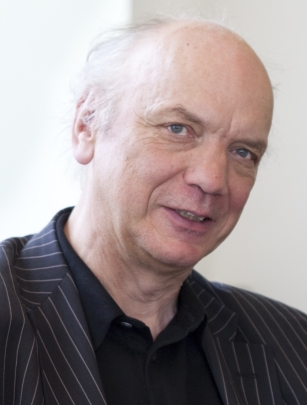
Jürgen Hennig (2010)

Jürgen Klaus Hennig (born in Stuttgart, Germany on March 5, 1951) is a German chemist and medical physicist. Internationally he is considered to be one of the pioneers of Magnetic Resonance Imaging for clinical diagnostics. He was until his retirement 2022 the Scientific Director of the Department of Diagnostic Radiology and Chairman of the Magnetic Resonance Development and Application Center (MRDAC) at the University Medical Center Freiburg. Despite his retirement, he is still active as a researcher (as of 3/2025). In In addition to numerous scientific awards he received in 2025 the Order of Merit of the state Baden-Wuerttemberg. He is married to Annemarie Hennig Rüegg and has two children, Julian and Olivia. Olivia died in 2009.

== Biography ==
=== Scientific career ===
From 1969 to 1977 Hennig studied chemistry in Stuttgart, London, Munich and Freiburg. During the years from 1977 to 1981 he was employed as a scientist at the Institute of Physical Chemistry (IPC) of the University of Freiburg, where he completed his doctoral degree on NMR measurements of intramolecular exchange kinetics under the supervision of Herbert Zimmermann. During this time Hennig first came into contact with Magnetic Resonance Imaging (MRI) at the inaugural lecture of his advisor Hans-Heinrich Limbach on the work of Paul Lauterbur, a subsequent winner of the Nobel Prize.

From 1982 to 1983 Hennig was a post-doctoral student at the University of Zurich, where he worked in the area of CIDNP Spectroscopy. In 1982 he developed his first own NMR pulse sequence to measure intramolecular exchange processes. During his time in Zurich Hennig decided to focus his future work in the area of NMR method development with less focus on chemistry.

Hennig began his work at the University Medical Center Freiburg in 1984 as a scientific researcher in the Department of Diagnostic Radiology. There, in cooperation with the company Bruker Medizintechnik GmbH, he developed the RARE-Method. In the year 1989 he completed his professorial thesis of “Special Imaging Techniques for the Nuclear Magnetic Resonance Tomography” at the Medical Faculty of the University of Freiburg.

In the year 1993, Hennig was appointed a professorship at the University Medical Center Freiburg as the head of the MR Tomography work group in the Department of Diagnostic Radiology. In 1998 he was designated as the Director of the Department of Imaging and Functional Medical Physics of the Department of Diagnostic Radiology. In 2001 he became Research Director of the Department of Diagnostic Radiology. In the same year he founded the Magnetic Resonance Development and Application Center (MRDAC) at the University Medical Center Freiburg. A cooptation at the School of Mathematics and Physics of the University of Freiburg followed in the year 2002.

In 2004 Hennig was appointed C4-Professor at the University Medical Center Freiburg and since then he is the Scientific Director of the Department of Diagnostic Radiology. The research group for research and development in MRI that he founded and headed since 1984 grew to approximately 80 employees by the end of 2012.

In 1999 Hennig was the President of the International Society for Magnetic Resonance in Medicine (ISMRM). Since 2008 he has been a joint affiliate to the Wisconsin Institute for Medical Research at the University of Wisconsin–Madison. Since 2011 he has been a member of the German Academy of Sciences Leopoldina.

=== Works ===
Hennig’s research work was aimed at fundamental, preclinical, clinical research as well as clinical applications. His main areas of research were neurology and neuroscience, oncology, cardiac and cardiovascular, and metabolic research. His goal was to give space for free and fundamental research, but once a new method turned out to be clinically useful, he went all the way to bring it to clinical application. He always found it important to be open to different application scenarios rather than being focused on one specific application domain. More than once he found out, that a method first developed for a specific area of application (like cardiac) has turned out more useful in another area (like neuroscience).Hennig has written numerous fundamental research papers on the development of Magnetic Resonance Imaging (MRI).

Based on the CPMG multi-echo method, Hennig developed the RARE Sequence (Rapid Acquisition with Relaxation Enhancement) in 1984. Through his work the MR image acquisition time could be significantly reduced, which constituted an important step for its use in clinical routine. In addition, RARE offered the possibility to control the diagnostically relevant T2 contrast in MRI. The RARE method was first published in 1984 in the German journal “Der Radiologe”. His first submission to an international journal was rejected, with the comment that this method had already been tested and wouldn’t work. In the year 1986 international publications followed. RARE is currently one of the standard methods used in clinical MRI. The method is also known by the acronyms TSE (Turbo Spin Echo) and FSE (Fast Spin Echo).

In 1991 Hennig published the so-called Extended Phase Graph(EPG)-method, which allows to calculate the signal intensity after MR-sequences with an arbitrary number of radiofrequency pulses. The EPG method is intensely used in the design of many current MR-methods like MR-Fingerprinting. It has also been the basis of the development of the Hyperecho and and TRAPS-methods, which were published by Hennig in 2001 and 2003 respectively. These allow to significantly reduce the specific absorption rate (SAR) of a RARE sequence without loss of image quality, which is essential for clinical MRI applications at high magnetic field strengths of 3T and higher.

In 2008 Hennig published a concept for imaging with non-linear magnetic field gradients which allows to use stronger and faster magnetic field gradients.

This development was performed in the context of the bi-national innovation project INUMAC/ISEULT, in which Hennig coordinated the German academic research effort.

As a radical new approach to increase imaging speed Hennig developed in 2005 the MR-encephalography(MREG)-method, which in its ultimate form does not require any magnetic field gradients for spatial encoding but uses the sensitive volumes of multiarray receiver-coils as primary source of spatial information. In the current standard implementation some gradient encoding is used to increase spatial resolution, while still maintaining an unprecedented imaging speed of 10 volumes per second for a whole brain 3D-dataset with 3 mm isotropic resolution. The method has been distributed to many research groups worldwide and is used to observe dynami variations in brain network activities as well as for investigation of the glymphatic system of the brain.

In the mid-2010s Hennig advocated the concept of a 5T-whole body MRI scanner as a practical field strength for whole body MRI. 7T-scanners were already on the market, but there use was focused on brain imaging and they had to be typically placed outside of the radiological suite due to their large size.

Whole-body imaging at 7T was limited by the high radiofrequency power at that field strength, which does not allow to use the full diagnostic repertoire of methods common at lower field strength. Hennig hypothesized, that a 5T system would allow the full use of diagnostic examination methods and would be small enough to fit into a typical examination room. He propagated the idea on several conferences and in discussion with various vendours. In 2016 he could convince United Imaging of the concept. The final product was launched in 2024, the performance confirmed and exceeded the expectations and earned Hennig the title ‘Father of 5T’.

In 2022 Hennig combined his RARE-method with spatial encoding using a segmented spiral k-space trajectory. This allows to acquire a high-resolution image with 1 mm spatial resolution in ~ 200 ms. This SpiralTSE-method can be used for fast parametric imaging and allows to quantify multi-exponential T1- and T2- parameters, as well as magnetic transfer(MT) effects in well under 3 min.

=== Connections to Asia ===
In the year 1985 Hennig travelled to Guangzhou, China in order to set up one of the first MRI systems in China. With this the first MR image was taken in China on December 25, 1985. Since then he has attended other MRI system installations in China.

Hennig has been president and founding member of the European-Chinese Society for Clinical Magnetic Resonance since 1993. He is honorary member of the Chinese Radiological Society. Hennig was awarded “Einstein Professor” of the Chinese Academy of Science in 2011. In 2010 he received the Tsung Ming Tu Award, which is the highest scientific award of Taiwan.

Since 2004 Hennig is a member of the Academy of Science of the Republic of Tatarstan. Furthermore, he maintains cooperations with Hong Kong, South Korea and Singapore.

=== Statistics ===
His group had a total 286 members since 1993, he supervised 94 PhD Thesis.

Until his retirement in December 2021, he had published 515 publications in peer reviewed scientific journals with a total number of 998 co-authors, 50 as first author and 119 as last author. His top 3 journals are: Magnetic Resonance in Medicine (116) Journal of Magnetic Resonance Imaging (27) and Magnetic Resonance Materials in Physics Biology and Medicine (25).

== Selected publications ==
- Hennig, J.; Nauerth, A.; Friedburg, H. (1986). "RARE imaging: A fast imaging method for clinical MR". Magnetic Resonance in Medicine. 3 (6): 823–833. doi:10.1002/mrm.1910030602. ISSN 0740-3194.
- Saur, Dorothee; Kreher, Björn W.; Schnell, Susanne; Kümmerer, Dorothee; Kellmeyer, Philipp; Vry, Magnus-Sebastian; Umarova, Roza; Musso, Mariacristina; Glauche, Volkmar; Abel, Stefanie; Huber, Walter; Rijntjes, Michel; Hennig, Jürgen; Weiller, Cornelius (2008-11-18). "Ventral and dorsal pathways for language". Proceedings of the National Academy of Sciences. 105 (46): 18035–18040. doi:10.1073/pnas.0805234105. ISSN 0027-8424. PMC 2584675.
- Morgan, Bruno; Thomas, Anne L.; Drevs, Joachim; Hennig, Juergen; Buchert, Martin; Jivan, Asvina; Horsfield, Mark A.; Mross, Klauss; Ball, Howard A.; Lee, Lucy; Mietlowski, William; Fuxius, Stefan; Unger, Clemens; O’Byrne, Ken; Henry, Andrew (2003-11-01). "Dynamic Contrast-Enhanced Magnetic Resonance Imaging As a Biomarker for the Pharmacological Response of PTK787/ZK 222584, an Inhibitor of the Vascular Endothelial Growth Factor Receptor Tyrosine Kinases, in Patients With Advanced Colorectal Cancer and Liver Metastases: Results From Two Phase I Studies". Journal of Clinical Oncology. 21 (21): 3955–3964. doi:10.1200/jco.2003.08.092. ISSN 0732-183X.
- Stalder, A.F.; Russe, M.F.; Frydrychowicz, A.; Bock, J.; Hennig, J.; Markl, M. (2008-10-27). "Quantitative 2D and 3D phase contrast MRI: Optimized analysis of blood flow and vessel wall parameters". Magnetic Resonance in Medicine. 60 (5): 1218–1231. doi:10.1002/mrm.21778. ISSN 0740-3194.
- Hennig, J (1988). "Multiecho imaging sequences with low refocusing flip angles". Journal of Magnetic Resonance. 78 (3): 397–407. doi:10.1016/0022-2364(88)90128-x. ISSN 0022-2364.
- Zaitsev, M.; Dold, C.; Sakas, G.; Hennig, J.; Speck, O. (2006). "Magnetic resonance imaging of freely moving objects: prospective real-time motion correction using an external optical motion tracking system". NeuroImage. 31 (3): 1038–1050. doi:10.1016/j.neuroimage.2006.01.039. ISSN 1053-8119.
- Markl, Michael; Harloff, Andreas; Bley, Thorsten A.; Zaitsev, Maxim; Jung, Bernd; Weigang, Ernst; Langer, Mathias; Hennig, Jürgen; Frydrychowicz, Alex (2007-03-07). "Time‐resolved 3D MR velocity mapping at 3T: Improved navigator‐gated assessment of vascular anatomy and blood flow". Journal of Magnetic Resonance Imaging. 25 (4): 824–831. doi:10.1002/jmri.20871. ISSN 1053-1807.
- Ernst, Thomas; Hennig, Jürgen (1994). "Observation of a fast response in functional MR". Magnetic Resonance in Medicine. 32 (1): 146–149. doi:10.1002/mrm.1910320122. ISSN 0740-3194.
- Scheffler, Klaus; Hennig, Jürgen (2003-01-22). "Is TrueFISP a gradient‐echo or a spin‐echo sequence?". Magnetic Resonance in Medicine. 49 (2): 395–397. doi:10.1002/mrm.10351. ISSN 0740-3194.
- Hennig, Juergen; Zhong, Kai; Speck, Oliver (2007). "MR-Encephalography: Fast multi-channel monitoring of brain physiology with magnetic resonance". NeuroImage. 34 (1): 212–219. doi:10.1016/j.neuroimage.2006.08.036. ISSN 1053-8119.

== Awards ==
- 1992: European Magnetic Resonance Award
- 1993: 'Kernspintomographie-Preis' (Magnetic Resonance Tomography Award) 1993
- 1994: Gold Medal Award of the Society of Magnetic Resonance
- 2003: Max Planck Research Award in der category Biosciences/Medicine
- 2006: Albers Schönberg Medal from the 'Deutschen Röntgengesellschaft' (German Radiology Society)
- 2010: Tsung Ming Tu Award from the National Science Council, Taiwan
- 2014: Honorary Doctorate from the University Maastricht
- 2015: Hounsfield Memorial Lecture Imperial College London
- 2016: Alfred-Breit-Preis from Deutschen Röntgengesellschaft (German radiological Society)
- 2025: Order of Merit of Baden-Württemberg

== Quotes ==
I did not have much of a feeling of being 'inventive', I was just applying what I had learned about spin physics during my days in physical chemistry to the task at hand.

— Jürgen Hennig, in „How RARE came to China“ on the development of the RARE method

The world (and the world of MR in particular) is full of 'impossible' things which turned out to become reality.

— Jürgen Hennig, in „Ultra high field MR: useful instruments or toys for the boys?“
