= Synthetic MRI =

Simulation method

Synthetic MRI is a simulation method in Magnetic Resonance Imaging (MRI), for generating contrast weighted images based on measurement of tissue properties. The synthetic (simulated) images are generated after an MR study, from parametric maps of tissue properties. It is thereby possible to generate several contrast weightings from the same acquisition. This is different from conventional MRI, where the signal acquired from the tissue is used to generate an image directly, often generating only one contrast weighting per acquisition. The synthetic images are similar in appearance to those normally acquired with an MRI scanner.

The parametric maps can be computed from a particular MRI acquisition designed to measure the tissue parameters, known as quantification. Using the maps, which contains the measured parameters for each voxel, virtual scanner settings that correspond to those used in conventional scan are given. These settings can be echo time (TE) and repetition time (TR) for a spin-echo (SE) sequence or TE, TR and inversion time (TI) for an inversion recovery (IR, FLAIR, STIR, PSIR, FSE-IR, TIRM) sequence. Using the signal equations for different types of MR acquisitions, it is then possible to calculate what a conventional image would look like. Calculating the images based on maps and scanner settings is called synthesizing the images.

== History of Synthetic MRI ==
Synthetic MRI was proposed as early as 1984 Bielke et al. and 1985 by Bobman et al.

Although scientifically interesting, the method was cumbersome for clinical use. The acquisition duration was too long for a patient to lie still, and the computations needed for quantification were too demanding for the standard commercial computers of the day.

For the computers, the problem was both overall computational speed and handling numbers over 16 bit. To perform the synthetization, Lee et al. suggested a purpose-built computer that would be able to synthesize images in about 600 ms. It would use a look-up table to save computations and be capable of handling number sizes up to 28 bit. This device did however not solve the calculation needs for quantification, nor the long acquisition times.

MR Image Expert, a software to create synthetic magnetic resonance images, was introduced in the late 1980s. It was aimed at educational and research purposes, among them contrast agent applications. Since 1989, more than 12,000 licenses of this software have been distributed.

In 2004 the first rapid acquisition and quantification method for creating parametric maps was invented. This new acquisition method performs 8 acquisitions at 4 different excitation delays, giving 8 values to estimate T1, T2, PD and M0 for each imaged voxel.

There are also other methods for creating the parametric maps being researched. Most notable is Magnetic Resonance Fingerprinting. This method uses a randomized acquisition that creates a unique response depending on T1-T2-PD values of a voxel. This unique response is then matched against a database of response from all possible T1-T2-PD combinations.

== Features of Synthetic MRI ==
Creating a synthetic contrast weighted image is very quick and the scanner setting parameters can be changed interactively. This is different from acquiring the images directly on the MRI scanner with a pulse sequence where it might take several minutes to get new images with different settings. Synthetic MRI also enables the possibility to create new image contrast weightings after the scan has been completed and the patient has left the hospital. A prospective multi-reader, multi-case, multi-center clinical trial of overall image quality of synthetic MRI compared to conventional MRI in a general neuroimaging population has shown that synthetic MRI is non-inferior to conventional imaging.

=== The parametric maps ===
Synthetic MRI is based on parametric maps. These maps are generated by using the MR scanner not to acquire an image, but to measure magnetic properties in the tissue.

The parametric maps can for example be longitudinal (T1) and transversal (T2) relaxation times as well as either proton density (PD) or apparent equilibrium magnetization (M0). It is conceivable to use other parameters depending on the acquisition sequence to be simulated, but these are sufficient for spin-echo and inversion recovery acquisitions.

=== Governing equations for Synthetic MRI ===
The synthetic images are calculated using the signal equation of the type of image synthesized. The signal equation is a formula for calculating the signal intensity, i.e. the numerical value, of an image pixel. The signal intensity S in a pixel depends on the tissue properties T1, T2 and PD of the corresponding voxel, as well as the echo time TE and repetition time TR.

The equation for synthesizing a fast spin-echo (FSE) image is:

$S = PD \cdot \exp(-TE/T_2) \cdot (1-\exp(-(TR-ETL\cdot ESP) / T_1))$

Here ETL is the echo train length, and ESP is the spacing of echoes in the echo train. If the acquisition simulated has the echo in the middle of ETL used for central k-space then $ETL \cdot ESP = 2\cdot TE$. The scanner parameters TE and TR are the same over the entire slice/volume that is being synthesized but the parameters T1, T2, PD and the resulting signal S are different for different voxels. The parameters T1, T2, and PD correspond to physical properties of the tissue within the voxel.

For an inversion recovery (IR) sequence the equation is:

$S = PD \cdot \exp(-TE/T_2) \cdot (1-2\exp(-TI/T_1)+\exp(-(TR-ETL\cdot ESP)/T_1))$

Note that setting $TI = TR-ETL\cdot ESP$ means that the signal equation becomes identical to the equation for FSE. This is because the inversion pulse is executed at the end of acquisition where the longitudinal magnetization is 0 due to excitation pulse being played out before acquisition.

For a double inversion recovery (DIR) sequence the equation is:

$S = PD \cdot \exp(-TE/T_2) \cdot (1-2\exp(-TI_1/T_1)+2\exp(-TI_2/T_1)-\exp(-(TR-ETL\cdot ESP)/T_1))$

Note that setting $TI_2 = TR-ETL\cdot ESP$ makes the signal equation identical to the IR equation, and setting $TI_1 = TI_2$ gives the same equation as for FSE (since the inversion pulses cancel out). The equation is derived under the assumption that $TI_1 \leq TI_2$.

For IR and DIR the signal may be negative in some voxels. In a real MRI scanner the signal is complex and due to off-resonance effects and other scanner imperfections the phase of the complex value may vary between different voxels, this leads to it being difficult to distinguish between a positive and negative signal. It is common to only reconstruct the magnitude image. For the synthetic images it is easy to keep the sign of the synthesized signal and thereby effectively creating a contrast weight that corresponds to a phase-sensitive inversion recovery (PSIR) which may also be called IR Real or Corrected Real.

If apparent equilibrium magnetization (M0) is used instead of true PD there may be effects of coil sensitivity (central shading) and dielectric shading present in the images.

== Commercial availability ==
Dedicated acquisition for creating parametric maps is available on some scanners by GE and Philips, under the brand names MAGiC and SyntAc.

Post processing software for Synthetic MRI is available in the commercial product SyMRI from SyntheticMR AB which is included as an option called MAGiC on the MR console for GE's SIGNA Pioneer 3T MRI scanner. Since 2017, synthetic MRI is also available in Siemens machines.

Olea Medical offers a product similar to Synthetic MRI named Olea Nova+. It offers a method for automatically computing conventional images from a standard protocol: T1 and T2 mapping. Users are able to create any image contrast-weighed in T1, T2 (...) or maps combining various TE, TR, TI.

== See also ==
- Magnetic resonance imaging
- Relaxation (NMR)
