= Karla Miller =

American neuroscientist and academic

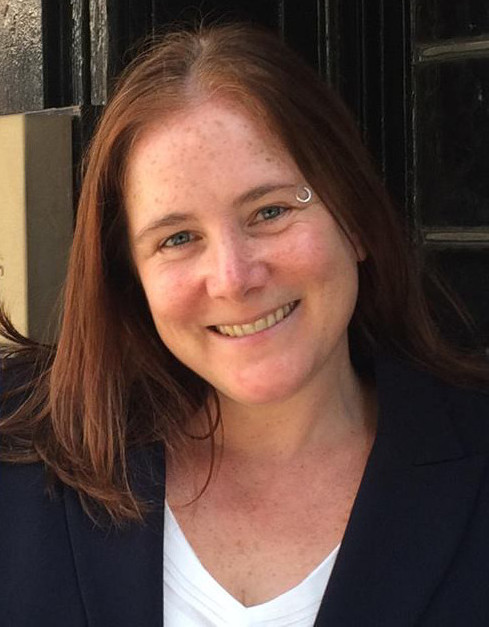
- Miller in 2016
- Born: Karla Loreen Miller
- Education: University of Illinois Urbana-Champaign (BS); Stanford University (PhD)
- Scientific career
- Fields: Magnetic Resonance Imaging; Neuroimaging; Diffusion MRI; Functional magnetic resonance imaging
- Workplaces: University of Oxford
- Thesis: Novel methods for steady-state neuroimaging (2004)
- Doctoral advisor: John M. Pauly
- Website: www.ndcn.ox.ac.uk/team/karla-miller

Karla Loreen Miller is an American neuroscientist and professor of biomedical engineering at the University of Oxford. Her research investigates the development of neuroimaging techniques, with a particular focus on Magnetic Resonance Imaging (MRI), neuroimaging, diffusion MRI and functional magnetic resonance imaging. She was elected a Fellow of the International Society for Magnetic Resonance in Medicine in 2016.

== Early life and education ==
Miller has said that she became interested in the brain as a child. Her mother had brain surgery when Miller was only twelve years old, and she became concerned that it might impact her personality. Miller was an undergraduate student majoring in computer science at the University of Illinois Urbana-Champaign. While in her senior year she won an undergraduate student achievement award for her research in medical imaging. She collaborated with staff at the University of California, San Diego to develop models to understand changes in blood flow and oxygenation during neural activation. Alongside the outstanding undergraduate award she was awarded the Spyglass award for academic achievement and a Franz Hohn and J. P. Nash Scholarship. She completed her doctoral research at Stanford University, where she was supervised by John M. Pauly and worked on steady-state neuroimaging. In particular, she looked to advance neuroscience through techniques such as functional magnetic resonance imaging (fMRI) and diffusion weighted imaging. She developed steady-state free precession imaging methods to improve the signal-to-noise ratio and spatial resolution of functional and diffusion imaging. In addition, she created navigator echoes that could improve the signal-to-noise ratio and reduce artefacts.

== Research and career ==
Miller joined the University of Oxford as a postdoctoral fellow in 2004. She was awarded a research fellowship from the Royal Academy of Engineering and Engineering and Physical Sciences Research Council (EPSRC) in 2006. In 2007 Miller was appointed a research lecturer at the University of Oxford and subsequently promoted to Professor of Biomedical Engineering in 2014.

Miller's research investigates new imaging techniques for collecting and analysing MRI images. In particular, she is interested in developing techniques for understanding neural microstructure, which she achieves using a combination of MRI with light and electron microscopy. Miller developed the UK Biobank brain imaging protocols, which could help to identify new biomarkers of disease and support diagnosis and development of therapeutics. By 2025 UK Biobank aims to scan 100,000 participants.

Alongside her research, Miller is interested in improving the organizational culture in research. She leads equality, diversity, and inclusion (EDI) work for the medical sciences division at the University of Oxford. Initiatives she has led include the promotion of laboratory handbooks that outline the ethos of a good laboratory working environment.

=== Selected publications ===
- Nonlinear phase correction for navigated diffusion imaging
- Multimodal population brain imaging in the UK Biobank prospective epidemiological study
- Diffusion imaging of whole, post-mortem human brains on a clinical MRI scanner
- A positive-negative mode of population covariation links brain connectivity, demographics and behavior

=== Awards and honors ===
Miller was made a Fellow of the International Society for Magnetic Resonance in Medicine in 2016.
