= Doug Underwood =

Doug or Douglas Underwood may refer to:

- Doug Underwood (journalist) (born 1948), American journalist and communications scholar
- Doug Underwood (speedway rider) (1946–2024), Australian motorcycle speedway rider
