= Shinnar–Le Roux algorithm =

The Shinnar–Le Roux (SLR) algorithm is a mathematical tool for generating frequency-selective radio frequency (RF) pulses in magnetic resonance imaging (MRI). Frequency selective pulses are used in MRI to isolate a slice through the subject for excitation, inversion and saturation.

Given a desired magnetization profile, determining the RF pulse that produces it is generally nonlinear, due to the non-linearity of the Bloch equations. At low tip angles, the RF excitation waveform can be approximated by the inverse Fourier Transform of the desired frequency profile, using the excitation kspace analysis. The small tip angle approximation continues to hold well for tip angles on the order of 90 degree. However, for tip angles greater than 90 degree, a different approach must be used.

A direct solution to the pulse design problem was independently proposed by Shinnar and Le Roux based on a discrete approximation to the spin domain version of the Bloch equations.

== Theory ==
The SLR algorithm simplifies the solution of the Bloch equations to the design of two polynomials, which can be solved using well-known digital filter design algorithms.

$$[B_1(t),\varphi(t)]\Longleftarrow SLR \Longrightarrow [A_N(z),B_N(z)]$$

Where N is the number of bins, or hard pulse divisions that you wish to approximate with, and φ(t) is the phase of the B_{1}(t) waveform at a given time t.

The mapping of the RF pulse into two complex polynomials will be denoted as the Forward SLR Transform. Given two polynomials $[A_N(z),B_N(z)]$ the SLR transform can be inverted to calculate the RF pulse that produces these polynomials. The order of the polynomials $[A_N(z),B_N(z)]$ is $N-1$. A minimum phase $A_N(z)$ results in a minimum energy RF pulse.
