= Hanne Albert =

Danish physiotherapist

Hanne Albert is a Danish physiotherapist with a Ph.D. in medical science. Her main research interest is in lower back pain and pelvic girdle pain. Albert's studies have revealed that bone œdema (Modic changes) could be caused by a bacterial infection and treated with antibiotics.

== Career and education ==
Albert was recognized and authorized as a physiotherapist by Metropolitan University College in Copenhagen. In 2000, she was awarded a Master of Public Health from the Nordic College for Public Health in Gothenburg, Sweden. The subject of her Master's thesis was Group Treatment of Women With Chronic Pelvic Pain.

Based on her thesis on Non-Surgical Treatment of Patients With Sciatica - A randomized clinical controlled trial , she was awarded a Ph.D. degree in 2004 from the faculty of health sciences, University of Southern Denmark.

Albert started her career as a physiotherapist at Odense University Hospital, where she later went on to become a clinical lecturer. In 2000, she was employed as a researcher in the research department of The Back Center in Ringe, Denmark. Between 2010 and 2013 she held the title of Associate Professor at the Faculty of Health Sciences, University of Southern Denmark. In 2013, she became the Medical Director at the Modicklinikken, Odense, Denmark.

== Research and publications ==
Albert has led or has been a part of several teams that have explored the area of back pain.

Her career in research began in the field of gynecology and obstetrics at the gynecology ward of Odense University Hospital, where she worked with women experiencing chronic pelvic pain. She partnered with another physiotherapist, Tove Boe, to develop a new treatment for women with chronic pelvic pain using a psychosomatic approach. They combined qualitative action research methods with quantitative measurements of improvement. The results showed that the patients improved significantly. This research was published in her Master's thesis and as a scientific paper.

Working with another physiotherapist, Mona Godskesen, Albert attempted to classify the different groups of pelvic girdle pain into subgroups that required different treatments. The study, which was the largest in the world, included 2269 pregnant women, all of whom were examined in the twentieth week of their pregnancy. The women who suffered from pelvic pain were followed at 1, 3, 6, 12, and 24 months post-partum, or until their pelvic pain subsided. The study found that there were most likely four different subgroups of pelvic girdle pain. Furthermore, the different groups have different incidences, and there are different clinical characteristics, pain patterns, and prognosis. The study also found that 5% of the pregnant women fell into the most important subgroup of Pelvic Girdle Syndrome. Unfortunately, these women have a poor prognosis and 20% of them will suffer from pain two years after the delivery of their child.

This research resulted in five scientific papers and three summaries. For this scientific work, she was given two awards and a seat in the European Guideline Group.

=== Disc herniation ===
In 2000, Albert was employed as a researcher and a Ph.D. student at The Back Center in Ringe, Denmark. The aim of her Ph.D. was to evaluate the possibility of treating patients with severe lumbar disc herniation via exercises. Normally, such patients would have been offered surgical intervention for treatment. The PhD study demonstrated that there was a significant improvement in patients receiving this kind of treatment. It also demonstrated that different symptoms would react to different treatments, i.e., specific exercises and positioning, as well as noting that patients with different types of herniation and different personality traits would require different treatments.

=== Modic changes ===
The Ph.D. study revealed that about 50% of the patients developed Modic changes in the vertebrae adjacent to the one previously herniated - this was visible one year after their disc herniation. These patients also developed back pain, whereas the main problem that they presented while having the lumbar disc herniation was pain radiating into one or both legs. Albert was the first to describe this connection between a previous herniation and new Modic changes in the adjacent vertebra. In 2007, she and radiologist Joan Solgård Sørensen published their ideas of three theories of the pathogenesis behind Modic changes: a bacterial cause, a mechanical cause, and a rheumatological cause.

=== Bacteria as a cause of back pain ===
The new idea that they presented suggested that, through a lesion in the herniated disc, the bacteria Propioni Acnes could invade the disc, and that Modic changes/bone edema was the edema surrounding the infected disc. Antibiotic treatment was a relevant treatment for an infection.

The first study of antibiotic treatment of Modic changes was published in 2008. In the study, 32 patients were treated with long-term antibiotics in a pilot study; 60% of this cohort showed significant improvement or had their back pain cured.

In 2013, the first randomized, clinically controlled trial was published. This study worked with 162 patients in a double-blind, placebo-controlled, and randomised clinical trial. It showed that an oral antibiotic treatment offered significant and clinically relevant improvement for these chronic low back pain patients by removing the bacterial infection.

The results created international interest. Previous opinions had been that back pain was either caused by mechanical problems in the tissue or the pain was psychosomatic. Now there was a third cause, demonstrating that back pain could be caused by bacterial infection.

=== Publications ===
Albert has been the head author or co-author of 55 scientific papers that were published in peer-reviewed papers. She has been the co-author of three books and was also an assistant editor of the European Spine Journal.

== Honours, awards, and distinctions ==
2003: Danish Physiotherapists Research Award for original and innovative research with immediate clinical relevance.
2004: The Columna Prize from The Danish Society for Musculoskeletal Medicine. For comprehensive clinical research in women with pelvic pain related to pregnancy and after delivery, and the extensive education to implement this new knowledge in all groups of health professionals.
2005: Modic changes following lumbar disc herniation. The best scientific presentation at the European Spine conference in Barcelona.
2017: The German Pain Prize for showing there was a third new cause of back pain due to a bacterial infection, instead of the early belief that back pain was either caused by mechanical problems in the tissue or the back pain was psychosomatic.

Albert was invited to be a part of the group that wrote the European guidelines for the diagnosis and treatment of pelvic girdle pain, which was published in 2008.
