= Jezzard =

Jezzard is a surname. Notable people with the surname include:

- Bedford Jezzard (1927–2005), English footballer
- Peter Jezzard (born 1965), British physicist and professor of neuroimaging
- Ralph Jezzard (1966-2025), British music producer
