= John Gore (researcher) =

Researcher in magnetic resonance imaging (MRI)

John Gore is the director of the Vanderbilt University Institute of Imaging Science (VUIIS). He holds the Hertha Ramsey Cress Chair in Medicine and serves as a professor of Radiology and Radiological Sciences, Biomedical Engineering, Molecular Physiology and Biophysics, and Physics at Vanderbilt University. He is a researcher in the field of magnetic resonance imaging (MRI).

In 2004, Gore was awarded the Gold Medal of the International Society for Magnetic Resonance in Medicine (ISMRM) for his contributions to the field of magnetic resonance imaging. He was also honored with the Earl Sutherland Award for Achievement in Research from Vanderbilt University in 2013.
