= Hannah Devlin =

English author

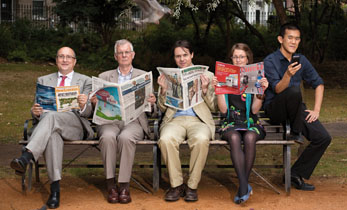
- UK Science Journalists: (left to right) Roger Highfield, Nigel Hawkes, Mark Henderson, Hannah Devlin, Ed Yong, in the 2011 Geek Calendar to support Libel Reform
- Education: St Bede's College, Manchester; Imperial College London (BSc); University of Oxford (DPhil)
- Known for: Science journalism
- Scientific career
- Institutions: Research Fortnight; The Times; The Guardian
- Thesis: Physiological variability in functional magnetic resonance imaging (2008)
- Doctoral advisor: Peter Jezzard
- Website: theguardian.com/profile/hannah-devlin

Hannah Devlin is a British author and journalist. She is the science correspondent for The Guardian.

== Education ==
Devlin attended St Bede's College, Manchester, where she studied A-Levels in Maths, Physics, French and General Studies. She completed an undergraduate degree in physics at Imperial College London in 2004 She has a Doctor of Philosophy degree in functional magnetic resonance imaging from the University of Oxford for research supervised by Peter Jezzard. In 2006, while Devlin was a DPhil student, she worked for The Times on a British Science Association Media Fellowship. She began her career as a journalist while completing her postgraduate studies. She was a finalist for the Young Science Writers award.

== Career ==
Devlin worked for Research Fortnight for a year, before getting a permanent job at The Times in 2009.

In 2015, Devlin was appointed to The Guardian. She works as the science correspondent for The Guardian, as well as presenting their podcast Science Weekly.

Devlin has also written for the journal Science. In 2017, she gave a keynote talk at the Human Tissue Association's annual conference. She has been shortlisted for the 2017 The Press Awards Science Journalist of the Year.

Devlin is an advocate for women in science. In 2011, she chaired a debate with Athene Donald, Ottoline Leyser and Keith Laws called Women of science, do you know your place?. She has contributed opinion pieces such as "Why don't women win Nobel science prizes?" and "Why are there so few women in tech? The truth behind the Google memo".
