= Magnetic Resonance in Medicine =

- Discipline: Medical imaging
- Language: English
- Edited by: Peter Jezzard

Publication details
- History: 1984–present
- Publisher: Wiley
- Frequency: Monthly
- Impact factor: 4.668 (2020)

Standard abbreviations
- ISO 4: Magn. Reson. Med.

Indexing
- CODEN: MRMEEN
- ISSN: 0740-3194 (print); 1522-2594 (web)
- OCLC no.: 637620172

Links
- Journal homepage; Online access; Online archive; [ ]

Magnetic Resonance in Medicine (MRM) is a monthly peer-reviewed medical journal covering research on all aspects of the development and use of nuclear magnetic resonance and electron paramagnetic resonance techniques for medical applications.

== History ==
The journal was established in April 1984 and is currently published by Wiley on behalf of the International Society for Magnetic Resonance in Medicine. Since 2019, the editor-in-chief has been Peter Jezzard, a professor at the University of Oxford.

=== Recent ===
In 2020, the journal introduced Data Availability Statements and began featuring reproducible research under the "MRM Highlights" initiative. The percentage of papers including shared code rose from approximately 10% in 2019 to nearly 33% by 2021, prompting an editorial in 2025 to announce further enhancements in open practices.

Starting in 2022, the journal began offering authors the option to choose between single-blind and double-blind peer review, reflecting evolving standards in editorial transparency.

In 2022–2023, the journal partnered with the Reproducible Research Study Group of the International Society for Magnetic Resonance in Medicine to trial an open "code review" process, allowing authors to submit their research code for independent, non-judgmental checks. Based on the success of this initiative, Magnetic Resonance in Medicine announced it would adopt the policy permanently in 2023.

== Abstracting and indexing ==
Magnetic Resonance in Medicine is indexed in major bibliographic databases, ensuring that its articles are widely accessible to researchers and students. It is included in:

- PubMed/MEDLINE, maintained by the U.S. National Library of Medicine, providing access to biomedical and clinical literature.
- Science Citation Index Expanded (Clarivate), a multidisciplinary index that tracks scientific literature and citation metrics.
- Scopus (Elsevier), one of the largest abstract and citation databases for peer-reviewed research across disciplines.

== Sister journal and related former serials ==
- Journal of Magnetic Resonance Imaging
- Proceedings of the Society of Magnetic Resonance in Medicine
- Proceedings of the International Society for Magnetic Resonance in Medicine

== See also ==
- International Society for Magnetic Resonance in Medicine (ISMRM)
- International Society for Magnetic Resonance in Medicine Gold Medal
- Open scientific data

== Bibliography ==
=== References ===
Secondary
- Malik, Shaihan (29 October 2024). News From King's College London: "Sharing Code for Community Review Improves MRI Research Efforts" (news blog). King's College London. Archived from the original on 5 November 2024.
Primary
- Board of Trustees (2019). "Announcing the New Editor-in-Chief of Magnetic Resonance in Medicine – Peter Jezzard, Ph.D." (news blog). Concord, California: International Society for Magnetic Resonance in Medicine. Archived from the original on 3 April 2024.
- Malik, Shaihan; Efrat Shimron; Sophie Schauman; Krishna Nayak; Prakash Kumar; Maria Eugenia Caligiuri; Francesco Santini; Nikola Stikov; Laura Bell; Cristian Montalba; and Peter Jezzard (February 2025). "Code Review Facility in Magnetic Resonance in Medicine" (PDF). Magnetic Resonance in Medicine (editorial). 93 (2): 452–454. doi:10.1002/mrm.30348; OCLC 10397348814 (article).
- Magnetic Resonance in Medicine – "Author Guidelines" (PDF). November 2022. Archived (PDF) from the original on August 22, 2025.
Tertiary
- "ISSN Portal record (ISSN 0740-3194)". ISSN Portal.
- "NLM Catalog record – Magnetic Resonance in Medicine". National Library of Medicine.
- "WorldCat record (OCLC 22469246)". WorldCat.
