= Doug Underwood (journalist) =

American communications scholar

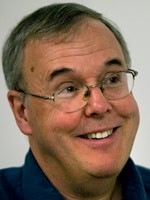
- Born: April 16, 1948 (age 78)
- Occupations: Journalist, academic, author and researcher

Academic background
- Education: B.A., English Literature; M.A., Journalism
- Alma mater: Pomona College; Ohio State University

Douglas Mark Underwood (born April 16, 1948) is an American journalist and media studies scholar. He is a Professor of Communication at the University of Washington.

Underwood's research primarily focuses on journalism in relation to literature, religion, trauma, and newsroom ethics and management. He has authored six books, including Journalism and the Novel: Truth and Fiction, Literary Journalism in British and American Prose: An Historical Overview, Chronicling Trauma: Journalists and Writers on Violence and Loss, When MBAs Rule the Newsroom: How the Marketers and Managers Are Reshaping Today’s Media, and From Yahweh to Yahoo!: The Religious Roots of the Secular Press.

== Education ==
Underwood received his Bachelor's degree in English Literature from Pomona College in 1970, and a Master's degree in Journalism from Ohio State University in 1974. He attended OSU on a University Fellowship while in the Kiplinger Public Affairs Reporting Program.

== Career ==
Underwood has developed and taught classes in political writing, narrative (creative non-fiction) journalism, trauma and journalism, and newsroom ethics and management at the UW Department of Communication since his appointment in 1987. He was a political and investigative reporter for The Seattle Times, the Gannett News Service in Washington, D.C., and the Lansing (Michigan) State Journal. He served as Capital bureau chief in Olympia from 1981 to 1984 and chief political writer for The Seattle Times from 1984 to 1987.

== Research ==
Underwood has worked extensively in the areas of journalism and literature, journalism and trauma, newsroom policies, and media and religion.

Underwood published his first book in 1995, entitled When MBAs Rule the Newsroom: How the Marketers and Managers Are Reshaping Today's Media. In it, he discussed the role of the press as an instrument of reform and a watchdog on powerful institutions – and the market-driven newsroom policies that were threatening it. Dean S. Narciso reviewed the book as "a hard-hitting compendium of business issues that have dominated the trade…." and called Underwood's tone "hopeful that writers will continue to aspire to the divine power of the written word." In 2002, Underwood published From Yahweh to Yahoo!, which examined the nature of the reform mission in American journalism and its connection to the nation's moral and religious heritage. John P. Ferré called the book "carefully researched" and "highly readable" in its examination of the "religious underpinnings of journalism from seventeenth-century England to present-day America." Quentin Schultz described the book as "one of the finest books written on the history" of U.S. journalism and accomplished scholarship that "reads like fine journalism."

In 2009, Jack Vespa reviewed Underwood's third book, Journalism and the Novel: Truth and Fiction, which covers three centuries of prose writing by journalists-turned-novelists and puts more emphasis on the "biographical details than literary specialists in the English novel have recently done." Journalism and Mass Communication Quarterly described the book as "edgy, original, and thought-provoking" and "a classic among the critical studies of literary journalism." Underwood's 2011 book, Chronicling Trauma: Journalists and Writers on Violence and Loss, highlights the lives of 150 of the best-known journalists and the role that early life trauma played in shaping their journalistic and literary careers. Jan Whitt has called Chronicling Trauma a "beautifully interdisciplinary work that effortlessly combines psychology, literature, and journalism studies to carve out its own frontier." Janice Hume called the book "fascinating" and "engrossing" in its weaving of biographical information into Underwood's examination of the role of traumatic experience in the writers’ lives and literary works.

John J. Pauly reviewed Underwood's The Undeclared War between Journalism and Fiction: Journalists as Genre Benders in Literary History, published in 2013. Pauly described the book as consisting of "Underwood's objections to postmodern literary criticism and to the recent scholarship on literary journalism," as well as a "discussion of censorship in the news business, of Hemingway's career, and of journalists' portrayals of journalists in their fiction." American Journalism described the volume as a "testament to the evolution of scholarship" in artistic nonfiction that "embodies meticulous documentation" and "challenges readers to reconsider the impact of the ongoing dance" that occurs along the boundaries of fiction and nonfiction.

According to Julie Wheelwright, Underwood's latest volume, Literary Journalism in British and American Prose (2019), provides a "timely contribution to the history of literary journalism" and sheds light on "the significant and complementary influence of British and American genre traditions in which journalism, literary criticism and scholarship overlap."

== Awards and honors ==
- 1975 – Michigan Associated Press Sports Story of the Year award at the Lansing State Journal, for uncovering sports recruiting irregularities at Michigan State University
- 1982 – Blethen Award for Distinguished Northwest Journalism for series in The Seattle Times on the influence of lobbyists in Washington state government
- 1984 – Travel series on climbing in Japanese Alps was cited in The Seattle Times’ Penney-Missouri national feature writing award
- 1990 – "Sportswriters and Sports Corruption," Columbia Journalism Review, anthologized in Best American Sports Writing 1990, Houghton-Mifflin
- 2003 – Distinguished Book Award, Society for the Scientific Study of Religion (SSSR), From Yahweh to Yahoo!
- 2006 – Selection of When MBAs Rule the Newsroom as one of 100 top books published by UW authors
- 2007 – From Yahweh to Yahoo! named one of the top books on the history of media and religion by the communication history journal, American Journalism
- 2014 – Finalist, Frank Luther Mott Award for best research-based book, The Undeclared War between Journalism and Fiction, by Kappa Tau Alpha

== Bibliography ==
=== Books ===
- When MBAs Rule the Newsroom: How the Marketers and Managers Are Reshaping Today's Media. Columbia University Press. 1993. OCLC 246906464.
- From Yahweh to Yahoo! The Religious Roots of the Secular Press. University of Illinois Press. 2002. OCLC 910528106.
- Journalism and the Novel: Truth and Fiction, 1700–2000. Cambridge University Press. 2008. ISBN 978-0-511-46344-0. OCLC 476232486.
- Underwood, Doug (2011). Chronicling Trauma: Journalists and Writers on Violence and Loss. University of Illinois Press. doi:10.5406/illinois/9780252036408.001.0001. ISBN 978-0-252-03640-8.
- The Undeclared War between Journalism and Fiction: Journalists as Genre Benders in Literary History. Palgrave Macmillan US. 2013. ISBN 978-1-137-35348-1. OCLC 1105415635.
- Literary Journalism in British and American Prose: An Historical Overview. McFarland. 2019. ISBN 978-1-4766-7621-0. OCLC 1049794531.

=== Selected articles and book chapters ===
- Underwood, D. & Stamm, K. (1992). Balancing Business with Journalism: Newsroom Policies at 12 West Coast Newspapers. Journalism Quarterly, 69(2), 301–317.
- Underwood, D. (2001). Reporting and the Push for Market-Oriented Journalism: Media Organizations as Businesses. In W. Lance Bennett & Robert M. Entman, eds., Mediated Politics and the Future of Democracy. Cambridge University Press, 99–116.
- Underwood, D., & Stamm, K. (2001). Are Journalists Really Irreligious? A Multidimensional Analysis. Journalism & Mass Communication Quarterly, 78(4), 771–786.
- Underwood, D. (2001). Secularists or Modern Day Prophets? Journalists’ Ethics and the Judeo-Christian Tradition. Journal of Mass Media Ethics, 16(1), 33–47.
- Underwood, D., & Bagwell, D.D. (2006). Journalists with Literary Ambitions No Less Satisfied with Their Jobs. Newspaper Research Journal, 27(2), 75–83.
- Underwood, D. (2007). Transcending the News: Religious Ambivalence Among the Famous Journalist-Literary Figures and Literature as the Uncertain Path to Immortality. Journal of Media and Religion, 6(4), 241–271
- Underwood, D. (2007). Depression, Drink, and Dissipation: The Troubled World of Famous Journalist-Literary Figures and Art as the Ultimate Stimulant. Journalism History, 32(4), 186–200.
- Underwood, D. (2012). Religion in Print Media. In Diane Winston, ed., The Oxford Handbook of Religion and the American News Media. Oxford University Press, 113–125.
- Underwood, D. (2020). Literary Journalism and American Magazines. In William E. Dow & Roberta S. Maguire, eds., Routledge Companion to American Literary Journalism. Routledge, 269–287.
- Underwood, D. (2021). Ethics, Religion and Journalism in the USA: Their Role within Political Dialogue and the Peacemaking Process. In Xenia Zeiler & Kerstin Radde-Antweiler, eds., Routledge Handbook of Religion and Journalism. Routledge, 263–278.
