= Ananyo Bhattacharya =

Science writer and journalist

- Education: University of Oxford (BA, physics); Imperial College London (PhD)
- Occupations: Science writer, journalist, author
- Writing career
- Genres: Popular science, biography
- Notable work: The Man from the Future (2021)
- Website: ananyobhattacharya.com

Ananyo Bhattacharya is a science writer and journalist based in London. He has worked as an editor at Nature and Chemistry World and as a science correspondent for The Economist, and is the author of The Man from the Future (2021), an intellectual biography of the mathematician John von Neumann.

== Education and early career ==
Bhattacharya studied physics at the University of Oxford and received a PhD in protein crystallography from Imperial College London. He then worked as a medical researcher at the Burnham Institute (now the Sanford Burnham Prebys Medical Discovery Institute) in San Diego, California.

== Journalism ==
Bhattacharya was a senior editor at Nature, Chemistry World and Research Fortnight. From 2014 to 2019 he worked at The Economist, first as community editor and then as a science correspondent. His writing has also appeared in Nautilus and The Spectator.

He later became chief science writer at the London Institute for Mathematical Sciences. In spring 2024 he was Science Communicator in Residence at the Simons Institute for the Theory of Computing at the University of California, Berkeley, during its programme on quantum algorithms, complexity and fault tolerance.

From 2020 to 2025 he was a member of the Royal Society's Science Policy Expert Advisory Committee.

== The Man from the Future ==
The Man from the Future: The Visionary Life of John von Neumann was published in the United Kingdom by Allen Lane in 2021 and in the United States by W. W. Norton & Company in 2022. The book surveys von Neumann's contributions to fields including quantum mechanics, game theory, the Manhattan Project, computer architecture and cellular automata.

The book was widely reviewed. In the Financial Times, David Bodanis praised its handling of von Neumann's work across disciplines and its "deadpan humour". Samanth Subramanian, writing in The New Republic, called it "a lucid and rewarding new biography". In The Wall Street Journal, Stephen Budiansky described it as "a tour de force of enjoyable science writing". Other reviews appeared in The Guardian, The New York Times, Kirkus Reviews and The Mathematical Gazette.

The Financial Times included the book in its best science books of 2021, and the playwright Tom Stoppard chose it as one of his books of the year in the Times Literary Supplement. In 2023 it appeared on Scientific American's list of books recommended by its staff.

The book has been translated into around a dozen languages, including Japanese, Korean, Dutch, Russian and Hungarian. The Hungarian edition, Neumann János – Az ember a jövőből, was published by Open Books in 2023 and was discussed by the Hungarian weekly HVG on the 120th anniversary of von Neumann's birth. A French translation, John von Neumann, l'homme qui venait du futur, was published by EPFL Press in 2023.

== Works ==
- Bhattacharya, Ananyo (2021). The Man from the Future: The Visionary Life of John von Neumann. London: Allen Lane. ISBN 978-0-241-39885-2.
