= Dwight Nishimura =

- Education: Stanford University
- Known for: Contributions to magnetic resonance imaging (MRI)
- Awards: Gold Medal, ISMRM (2018)
- Scientific career
- Workplaces: Stanford University
- Website: https://mrsrl.sites.stanford.edu/

Dwight G. Nishimura is the Addie and Al Macovski professor in the School of Engineering, and professor of Electrical Engineering at Stanford University. He leads the Magnetic Resonance Systems Research Laboratory (MRSRL), which designs improved MRI techniques and equipment.

== Education and career ==
Nishimura received his MS and BS in 1980 and a PhD in 1984 from Stanford University. All three degrees were in electrical engineering.

He develops new acquisition and processing techniques for improved medical imaging.

Nishimura holds approximately 25 patents as of July 2019.

== Awards and honors ==
- Gold Medal of the International Society of Magnetic Resonance in Medicine (ISMRM) (2018)
- IEEE Senior Member (2014)
- F. E. Terman Engineering Scholastic Award (1979). First cohort to receive this scholastic achievement award in the School of Engineering.
- Fellow of the American Institute for Medical and Biological Engineering (2004)
