= Research Fortnight =

500th issue of Research Fortnight

Research Fortnight is an independent publication that reports on research policy and funding in the U.K. It is sold by institutional subscription, and around 95% of universities in the UK subscribe to it, along with government agencies and research councils. The title is read by pro vice-chancellors for research, government scientists, policymakers, research managers, and individual researchers.

Research Fortnight was launched in 1994 by William Cullerne Bown, an entrepreneur and former journalist for The Independent and New Scientist. It has since launched sister publications Research Europe, Onderzoek Nederland, Research Africa, Funding Insight, and HE. It maintains a database of research grants offered by government agencies, charities, and other providers across the world to which subscribers have access. With a team of 20 reporters, editors, and managers, they provide daily weekday updates that are behind a paywall on its website. It also offers a limited daily selection of free news.

The company employs 90 staff in Shoreditch, London. It also has offices in Australia and South Africa.

Its founder, William Cullerne Bown, sold the company that publishes Research Fortnight to the US company Proquest in 2018. Proquest, and Research Fortnight, is now part of Clarivate.

== History ==
Research Fortnight was founded following a decade-long squeeze on research funding that made it ever harder for researchers to find funding for their work. At the same time, the UK government sought to assert greater control over the research councils—arm’s length bodies that distribute public funds for research—by appointing John Cadogan, a former chief scientist at BP, as the first director general of the research councils. Research Fortnight was created to inform readers of existing funding opportunities and the policies that would affect future funding opportunities.

Research Fortnight is well known for its reporting on the Research Assessment Exercises held in 1996, 2001 and 2008, and for its analysis of the results of the 2014 Research Excellence Framework, an exercise that informs the allocation of £6 billion of public spending on research in the UK. In 2014 it warned that unless the government acted to distribute research funding differently, money would accumulate in London and the south east of England. Its analysis was reported by the BBC, the Financial Times, The Guardian, The Telegraph and many other outlets.

Andre Geim, who shared the Nobel Prize in Physics in 2010, guest edited the 500th issue, which appeared on 17 May 2017 and contained an interview with George Osborne, a former chancellor of the exchequer.

== Format ==
Printed copies of Research Fortnight and Research Europe are produced every two weeks. Daily news is circulated to subscribers by email and is behind a paywall on the ResearchProfessional.com site.

The printed blue-on-cream copies are instantly recognizable. They contain a cover story, an editorial, news and comment, plus an “interesting if true” back-page column. The titles also contain news of funding opportunities and jobs. Many high-profile contributors write for the comment section, including Nobel laureates, government ministers, research leaders, policy analysts and commentators.

== Social media ==
Journalists at the company run several official Twitter accounts that link to limited free content, including @ResFortnight and @ResearchEurope.

== Staffing ==
The editors of Research Fortnight and Research Europe include:

- William Cullerne Bown
- Ian Mundell
- Colin Macilwain
- Ehsan Masood

Many reporters employed by the company have progressed to prominent positions in the media and/or think tanks. They include:

- Ananyo Bhattacharya (Nature, The Economist)
- Daniel Cressey (Nature)
- Hannah Devlin (The Times, The Guardian)
- Lee Elliot Major (Wellcome Trust, Sutton Trust)
- Anna Fazackerley (Times Higher Education, Policy Exchange, ministerial speechwriter)
- Miriam Frankel (The Conversation)
- Elizabeth Gibney (Times Higher Education, Nature)
- Natasha Gilbert (Nature)
- Rachel Hall (The Guardian)
- Laura Hood (The Conversation)
- Alok Jha (The Guardian, ITN)
- Anthea Lipsett (Times Higher Education, The Guardian)
- Natasha Loder (Nature, The Economist)
- Penny Sarchet (New Scientist)
- Adam Smith (The Economist)
- Inga Vesper (SciDev.Net)
