= Brian Worthington =

English radiologist

Brian Worthington FRS FRCR
- Born: Brian Stewart Worthington; 9 June 1938; Oldham, England
- Died: December 9, 2007 (aged 69)
- Education: Guy's Hospital
- Medical career
- Profession: Consultant neuroradiologist
- Field: Neuroimaging
- Research: MRI
- Awards: RCR Gold Medal

Brian Stewart Worthington FRS FRCR (9 June 1938 – 9 December 2007) was the first radiologist to be elected a Fellow of the Royal Society and is acknowledged as a pioneer in clinical magnetic resonance imaging. He was born in Oldham, England and was educated at Hulme Grammar School, training at Guy's Hospital after graduating in physiology and medicine. After graduation his career developed rapidly, particularly in the field of MRI research and he was subsequently admitted as a Fellow of the Royal College of Radiologists.

== Early career ==
From grammar school he won a scholarship to Guy's Hospital, where he won three major prizes in medicine and graduated with MB BS in medicine and BSc (Hons) in physiology. After his medical training, he worked at Guy's Hospital and then moved from London and worked as a consultant radiologist in Nottingham and Derby hospitals and from 1971 as a consultant neuroradiologist. He was part of the developing medical school in the then recently built Queen's Medical Centre (QMC) teaching hospital Nottingham, and formed a close working relationship with Rex Coupland who was Foundation Professor in the University of Nottingham Department of Human Morphology. In 1975, he was appointed as a Reader in the Department of Human Morphology and in 1981 as Professor of Diagnostic Radiology.

== MRI development ==
Although primarily a neuroradiologist, he was also interested in neuroimaging of the brain and when the University of Nottingham became a centre of early MRI development, it quickly became apparent that there was a need for accurate correlation of magnetic resonance images with anatomical structures and Worthington was considered to be the local expert. Raymond Andrew's research group had published small novel cross sectional images of fruit and also a human wrist in the scientific journal Nature and it was with this group that he made his first clinical evaluations in Nuclear Magnetic Resonance Imaging. When the research group scaled up to whole body imaging experiments, he was instrumental in the first evaluation study to be carried out on a series of patients with a variety of intracranial abnormalities.

Following the disbandment of Andrew's group, he began a long collaboration and association with Peter Mansfield and eventually held the post of Professor of Diagnostic Radiology at the University of Nottingham and had his own small department in the QMC. In Mansfield's group he contributed to the potential of Echo-planar imaging, attending and promoting this technique at conferences and meetings around the world. He lectured on clinical aspects of MRI and gave more than 300 invited lectures at international events and produced over 300 scientific and clinical papers. As well as producing seminal clinical evaluation papers, he contributed to a whole range of clinical applications such as obstetrics and gynaecology which included physiological and pathological studies in pregnancy. He trained a large number of clinical radiologists, who went on to develop the clinical applications of MRI.

Throughout his career his papers related to MRI, X-ray and CT (computed tomography) scanning, as well as medical imaging in general. As a radiologist he was interested in all forms of medical imaging and much of his work has been archived as part of the Manuscripts and Special Collections catalogue by the University of Nottingham.

== Personal life ==
Worthington was married with two sons. He had a great interest in the Icelandic language which he could speak quite well and when he retired, he took a part-time degree on the topic.

== Honours ==
During the course of his life, he received many awards.

- He was elected President of the British Institute of Radiology in 1988 and in 1990 was awarded the Gold Medal of the Society of Magnetic Resonance.
- In 1998 he was elected Fellow of The Royal Society, the first radiologist to be admitted in its history and awarded the coveted Royal College of Radiologists Gold Medal for significant contribution in his field.
- He was an inaugural Fellow of the Academy of Medical Sciences (1998).

== Death ==
He became ill from pancreatic cancer and died in December 2007.
