= Daniel K. Sodickson =

American physicist and academic

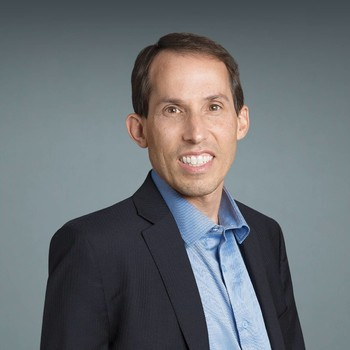
- Born: August 12, 1966; Newton, Massachusetts
- Education: Yale College (BS)(BA), Massachusetts Institute of Technology (PhD); Harvard Medical School (MD)
- Known for: Magnetic Resonance Imaging
- Awards: Gold Medal, International Society for Magnetic Resonance in Medicine(2006)
- Scientific career
- Workplaces: Harvard Medical School; Beth Israel Deaconess Medical Center; New York University (NYU) Grossman School of Medicine

Daniel Kevin Sodickson is an American physicist and an expert in the field of biomedical imaging. A past president and gold medalist of the International Society for Magnetic Resonance in Medicine, he is credited with foundational work in parallel magnetic resonance imaging (MRI), in which distributed arrays of detectors are used to gather magnetic resonance images at previously inaccessible speeds. Sodickson is an elected Fellow of the US National Academy of Inventors. He currently serves as Chief of Innovation in the Department of Radiology at New York University (NYU) Grossman School of Medicine, as Principal Investigator of the Center for Advanced Imaging Innovation and Research, and as Co-Director of NYU's Tech4Health Institute. He is a member of the National Advisory Council for the National Institute of Biomedical Imaging and Bioengineering (NIBIB).

== Education and career ==
Sodickson grew up in Newton, Massachusetts, the son of a physicist and a social worker. He attended the Roxbury Latin School from 1978-1984, matriculating at Yale College in 1984. Dr. Sodickson graduated from Yale in 1988 with a BS in Physics and a BA in Humanities. He earned his PhD in Medical Physics from MIT in 2004 and his MD from Harvard Medical School in 2006, both as a part of the Harvard-MIT Division of Health Sciences and Technology.

Sodickson then joined the faculty of Harvard Medical School, ultimately serving as Director of Magnetic Resonance Research in the Department of Radiology at Beth Israel Deaconess Medical Center in Boston, Massachusetts, before he joined NYU School of Medicine in 2006 as Director of the Department of Radiology's Bernard and Irene Schwartz Center for Biomedical Imaging. In 2009, he became Vice-Chair for Research in Radiology at NYU. He transitioned to Chief of Innovation in Radiology in 2022.

A member, Fellow, and former Trustee of the ISMRM, Sodickson served as its President in 2017-2018. He also chaired the National Institutes of Health Study Section on Biomedical Imaging Technology (BMIT-A) from 2016-2018. He was appointed to the National Advisory Council of the NIBIB in 2023.

== Research and Professional Activities ==
Following Sodickson's 1997 paper introducing a rapid imaging technique called SiMultaneous Acquisition of Spatial Harmonics (SMASH), research and development in parallel MRI burgeoned, along with related research in image reconstruction and detector design. Parallel imaging hardware and software is now an integral part of modern MRI machines, and is used routinely in MRI scans worldwide. For his work in parallel MRI, Sodickson was awarded the Gold Medal of the ISMRM in 2006.

Sodickson's research team at NYU has developed rapid, continuous, comprehensive imaging approaches, taking advantage of complementary tools in image acquisition and reconstruction, including parallel imaging and detector arrays, compressed sensing, and artificial intelligence (AI).

Sodickson has been a leader in exploring new uses of emerging AI techniques in medical imaging. He helped to initiate the fastMRI collaboration between NYU Grossman School of Medicine and Facebook Artificial Intelligence Research, announced in August 2018, which aimed to accelerate MRI using machine learning methods, and which also resulted in a large open-source repository of raw MRI data.

In recent times, Sodickson has taken an interest in new uses of imaging, sensing, and multimodal medical testing for proactive health monitoring, writing and speaking on the subject in both scholarly and popular settings, and advising health monitoring companies such as Ezra and Function Health.

In addition to delivering presentations at scientific meetings, Sodickson has spoken on the history and future of imaging in a variety of more general-interest venues. His general-interest book entitled The Future of Seeing will be published in October 2025.

== Selected Honors and Awards ==
- 2005: Fellow, International Society for Magnetic Resonance in Medicine
- 2006: Gold Medalist, International Society for Magnetic Resonance in Medicine
- 2013 Distinguished Investigator, Academy for Radiology and Biomedical Imaging Research
- 2014: Author of one of “30 Magnetic Resonance in Medicine Papers that Helped to Shape our Field”
- 2017: New Horizons Lecturer, Radiological Society of North America
- 2019: Kernspintomographie-Preis (Magnetic Resonance Imaging Award) recipient
- 2020: Fellow, US National Academy of Inventors
- 2022: Honorary Member, International Society for MR Radiographers & Technologists (ISMRT)
