= Magnetic resonance fingerprinting =

Magnetic resonance imaging technique

Magnetic resonance fingerprinting (MRF) is methodology in quantitative magnetic resonance imaging (MRI) characterized by a pseudo-randomized acquisition strategy. It involves creating unique signal patterns or 'fingerprints' for different materials or tissues after which a pattern recognition algorithm matches these fingerprints with a predefined dictionary of expected signal patterns. This process translates the data into quantitative maps, revealing information about the magnetic properties being investigated.

MRF has shown promise in providing reproducible and quantitative measurements, offering potential advantages in terms of objectivity in tissue diagnosis, comparability across different scans and locations, and the development of imaging biomarkers. The technology has been explored in various clinical applications, including brain, prostate, liver, cardiac, and musculoskeletal imaging, as well as the measurement of perfusion and microvascular properties through MR vascular fingerprinting.

== Motivation ==
In practical magnetic resonance acquisitions, measurements are often qualitative or 'weighted,' lacking inherent quantifiability. Factors like scanner type, setup, and detectors contribute to varying signal intensities for the same material across datasets. Current clinical MRI relies on terms like 'hyperintense' or 'hypointense,' lacking quantitative severity indicators and global sensitivity. Although quantitative multiparametric acquisition has been a research goal, existing methods often focus on single parameters, demand substantial scan time, and are sensitive to system imperfections. Simultaneous multiparametric measurements are generally impractical due to time constraints and experimental conditions. Consequently, qualitative magnetic resonance measurements remain the prevalent standard, especially in clinical settings.

MRF is connected to compressed sensing and shares expected benefits. Initial findings suggest that MRF could provide fully quantitative results in a time similar to traditional qualitative MRI, with reduced sensitivity to measurement errors. Importantly, MRF has the potential to simultaneously quantify numerous MRI parameters given sufficient scan time, expanding capabilities compared to current MRI techniques. This opens possibilities for computer-aided multiparametric MRI analyses, like genomics or proteomics, detecting complex changes across various parameters simultaneously. When paired with a suitable pattern recognition algorithm, MRF exhibits enhanced resilience to noise and acquisition errors, mitigating their impact.

== Working principle ==
MRF involves a three-step process: data acquisition, pattern matching, and tissue property visualization. During data acquisition, MR system settings are intentionally varied in a pseudorandom manner to create unique signal evolutions or "fingerprints" for each combination of tissue properties. Individual voxel fingerprints are compared with a simulated collection in a generated dictionary for the MRF sequence. The best match is selected through pattern matching, and the identified tissue properties are depicted as pixel-wise maps, providing quantitative and anatomical information. Originally designed for T1, T2, static magnetic field (B0) inhomogeneity, and proton density M0 measurements, recent advancements have demonstrated the feasibility of measuring additional properties such as radio frequency transmit field inhomogeneity (B1), T2* properties.

=== Data acquisition ===
Magnetic Resonance Fingerprinting (MRF) unlike MRI, dynamically varies acquisition parameters throughout the process. Unlike traditional methods that repetitively use the same parameters until full k-space data are acquired, MRF's flexible approach involves adjusting radiofrequency excitation angle (FA), phase, repetition time, and k-space sampling trajectory. This dynamic variation generates a unique signal time-course for each tissue, and proper sequence design is crucial for achieving useful, time-efficient, accurate, precise, and clinically relevant information.

Despite significant under-sampling, the signal evolution from all data points allows accurate and repeatable quantitative mapping. Spatio-temporal incoherence of under-sampling artifacts is a key consideration in designing the sampling strategy. Spiral or radial trajectories are commonly used for their higher spatial incoherence and sampling efficiency. Echo-planar imaging (EPI) and Cartesian trajectories have also demonstrated utility in the MRF framework. The trajectory re-ordering can be sequential, uniformly rotated, or random, depending on the sequence type and application.

MRF provides a flexible framework, theoretically allowing any sequence structure to be adopted for obtaining relevant tissue properties. The original MRF description was based on inversion recovery prepared balanced steady-state free precession (IR-bSSFP), sensitive to T1, T2, and static field (B0) inhomogeneity. Subsequent adaptations introduced various sequences, each addressing limitations, conferring advantages, or measuring additional tissue properties.

=== Pattern matching and tissue property visualization ===
Pattern matching in MRF involves comparing the patterns of signal evolutions from individual tissue voxels with entries in a precomputed dictionary of possible signal evolutions for the specific MRF sequence. This dictionary is generated using mathematical algorithms predicting spin behavior and signal evolution during the acquisition. Various models, such as Bloch Equations simulations and the extended phase graph formalism, have been employed to create these databases. More complex models have been used in MR vascular fingerprinting (MRvF) and Arterial Spin Labeling (MRF-ASL) perfusion to generate fingerprints for pattern matching.

Pattern matching introduces a degree of error tolerance, as long as the errors are spatially and temporally incoherent. In the original MRF acquisition, template matching involved calculating the vector-dot product of the acquired signal with each simulated fingerprint signal. The dictionary entry with the highest dot product was considered the best match, and the corresponding T1, T2, and B0 values were assigned to that voxel. The M0 value was determined as the multiplicative factor between the acquired and simulated fingerprints. This process proved time-efficient, accurate (showing good correlation with phantom values), precise, and insensitive to motion artifacts.

The collection of fingerprints may be generated once for each sequence and applied universally or individually for each patient, depending on the organ or physiological properties under evaluation. To enhance the speed, robustness, and accuracy of pattern matching and visualization, efforts have been directed toward speeding up the process. Compression methods in the time dimension or the application of fast group matching algorithms have been explored, resulting in a time reduction factor of 3–5 times with less than a 2% decrease in the accuracy of tissue property estimation.

== Clinical applications ==
=== Cardiac ===
Cardiac MRF has focused on myocardial tissue property mapping, offering simultaneous estimation of T1, T2, and M0 values with good concordance to conventional mapping methods. Future developments aim to reduce scan time, achieve volumetric acquisition for whole-heart coverage, and optimize M0 values.

=== Brain relaxometry ===
In brain relaxometry studies, MRF has shown good correlation for T1 and T2 values of grey and white matter. Studies have demonstrated its ability to simultaneously estimate T1 and T2 values for different brain regions, providing fast and regional relaxometry with correlations to age and gender. MRF has been employed in characterizing and differentiating intra-axial brain tumors, offering a valuable tool for distinguishing gliomas and metastases.

=== Abdomen ===
Adopting MRF for abdominal imaging presents unique challenges, including the need for fast sequences, high spatial resolution, and compensation for B0 and B1 inhomogeneities. Approaches like measuring B1 variation through separate scans and incorporating it into the dictionary simulation have been proposed, enabling successful application in abdominal imaging, even in the presence of liver metastases.
