= Robert R. Edelman =

American radiologist

Robert R. Edelman is an American radiologist.

Edelman earned a bachelor's degree in molecular biology and biochemistry at Yale University and completed his medical studies at the Boston University School of Medicine. He then pursued an internship at New York University Medical Center, followed by a residency in radiology at Beth Israel Hospital and a fellowship in radiology at Massachusetts General Hospital.

Edelman is the William B. Graham Chairman of Diagnostic Radiology at NorthShore University HealthSystem, and a clinical professor of radiology at Northwestern University's Feinberg School of Medicine.
