= Peter Roemer =

American engineer

Peter Bernard Roemer
- Known for: Chief Engineer at GE HealthCare; Member of the United States National Academy of Engineering (2021)
- Awards: Member, United States National Academy of Engineering (2021)
- Scientific career
- Fields: Engineering
- Institutions: GE HealthCare

Peter Bernard Roemer is an American engineer. He is a chief engineer at GE HealthCare, was elected a member of the United States National Academy of Engineering in 2021.

== Early life and education ==
Roemer studied at Middlesex County College, earning an Associate of Applied Science in Engineering Science in 1975. He later attended the Massachusetts Institute of Technology (MIT), where he received a Bachelor of Science in Electrical Engineering and Computer Science in 1978 and a Ph.D. in Nuclear Engineering in 1983.

== Career ==
Roemer began his career in 1983 at the GE Corporate Research and Development Center in Schenectady, New York, where he worked on electric motors and MRI technology. He was the principal inventor of self-shielded gradient coils (US Patent 4,737,716) and phased-array RF coils (US Patent 4,825,162), both of which became industry standards. For this work, he received GE’s Dushman Award in 1989.

From 1990 to 1994, Roemer managed GE’s MRI and Image Guided Therapy Program, directing teams that developed 3T and 4T MRI systems and the SIGNA SP 0.5T system for image-guided surgery at Brigham and Women’s Hospital. He later served as Vice President of Advanced NMR Systems before co-founding ONI Medical Systems in 1997. At ONI, Roemer oversaw the design and production of over 150 extremity MRI systems installed worldwide. After GE acquired ONI in 2009, he returned as Chief Engineer for Specialty MRI and subsequently became Chief Engineer for GE Global MRI Systems. He retired in 2020 but continued consulting, including collaborations with Stanford University Professor Brian Rutt on gradient coil design.

== Research and contributions ==
Roemer has authored or co-authored more than 20 journal papers, 47 conference proceedings, and holds over 30 U.S. patents. His work has had impact in MRI system design, particularly in:

- Development of self-shielded gradient coils, now used universally in MRI systems.
- Invention of phased-array RF coils, which significantly improved signal-to-noise ratio and imaging speed.
- Advances in gradient coil modeling, including electric field calculations and peripheral nerve stimulation prediction.
- Design of advanced MRI systems for research, conventional whole body systems and specialized systems MRI systems

== Awards and honors ==
- Election to the United States National Academy of Engineering (2021) “for contributions to performance improvement and widespread availability of MRI technology.”
- The members of the International Society of Magnetic Resonance in Medicine voted the NMR Phased Array Journal Article to be one of the 30 most influential MRM papers that have helped to shape our field over the last 30 years.
- Gold Medal of the International Society for Magnetic Resonance in Medicine (2009), the society’s highest honor.
- Fellow of the ISMRM (2007).
- GE Edison Engineer Award (2014).
- Multiple GE Corporate and Research Laboratory awards, including the Dushman Award (1989) and Whitney Gallery of Technical Achievers recognition.

== Professional service ==
- Member of the National Academy of Engineering Committee on High Magnetic Field Science in the United States.
- Board member of ONI Medical Systems (1997–2009) and ViewRay Inc. (2007–2015), a company developing MRI-guided radiation therapy systems.
- Reviewer for the National Institutes of Health and contributor to the Magnetic Resonance in Medicine journal.
