= Peter Jezzard =

British physicist and professor of neuroimaging

Peter Jezzard FInstP
- Born: 6 November 1965; Middlesbrough, England
- Education: University of Manchester (BSc); University of Cambridge (PhD)
- Children: 3
- Scientific career
- Fields: Magnetic Resonance Imaging; Neuroimaging; Ultra-high field MRI
- Institutions: University of Oxford, University College Oxford
- Doctoral advisor: L.D. Hall

Peter Jezzard FInstP (born 6 November 1965) is a British physicist and professor of neuroimaging at the University of Oxford. His research investigates the development of Magnetic Resonance Imaging (MRI) techniques, with a particular focus on vascular MRI and ultra-high field MRI. Since 2020, he has served as the editor-in-chief of the journal Magnetic Resonance in Medicine. He is an elected Fellow of the International Society for Magnetic Resonance in Medicine (ISMRM) and the Institute of Physics. At the ISMRM, he also holds a position on the board of trustees, having previously served as the president of the society in 2013–2014. Additionally, he currently holds the position of vice-master of University College Oxford.
