= Yi Wang =

Biomedical engineer

Yi Wang is the Faculty Distinguished Professor of Radiology and professor of biomedical engineering at Cornell University. He is a Fellow of the American Institute for Medical and Biological Engineering (2007), the IEEE (for which he also received citation "for contributions to cardiovascular MRI development and quantitative susceptibility mapping"), and a Senior Fellow of the International Society for Magnetic Resonance in Medicine (ISMRM). He was awarded in 2024 the Gold Medal of ISMRM "for pioneering contributions to the initial development of quantitative susceptibility mapping (QSM) and its many important applications, especially in the field of neurodegeneration".
