= Journal of Magnetic Resonance Imaging =

Peer-reviewed medical journal on clinical magnetic resonance imaging

- Discipline: Magnetic resonance imaging
- Language: English

Publication details
- History: 1991–present
- Publisher: Wiley on behalf of the International Society for Magnetic Resonance in Medicine (United States)
- Frequency: Monthly

Standard abbreviations
- ISO 4: J. Magn. Reson. Imaging

Indexing
- CODEN: JMRIFR
- ISSN: 1053-1807 (print); 1522-2586 (web)
- OCLC no.: 22469246

Links
- Journal homepage; [ ]

The Journal of Magnetic Resonance Imaging (JMRI) is a peer-reviewed medical journal covering research and clinical applications of magnetic resonance imaging (MRI). It was established in 1991 (volume 1, issue 1 in January 1991) and is published monthly by Wiley on behalf of the International Society for Magnetic Resonance in Medicine (ISMRM).

While the society’s other flagship journal, Magnetic Resonance in Medicine, emphasizes technical and methodological advances in MR physics and engineering, JMRI focuses on clinical MRI applications, including diagnostic imaging and radiology practice.

== Abstracting and indexing ==
The Journal of Magnetic Resonance Imaging is included in several widely used bibliographic and citation databases, which make its articles accessible to researchers, clinicians, and students worldwide. It is indexed in:

- PubMed/MEDLINE, maintained by the U.S. National Library of Medicine, which provides access to biomedical and clinical literature. 9105850
- Science Citation Index Expanded, produced by Clarivate, a multidisciplinary index that tracks scientific literature and citation data.
- Scopus, Elsevier’s abstract and citation database covering peer-reviewed research across science, technology, medicine, and social sciences.

== Sister journal and related former serials ==
- Magnetic Resonance in Medicine
- Proceedings of the Society of Magnetic Resonance in Medicine
- Proceedings of the International Society for Magnetic Resonance in Medicine

== See also ==
- International Society for Magnetic Resonance in Medicine (ISMRM)

== Bibliography ==
=== References ===
- "ISSN Portal record (ISSN 1053-1807)". ISSN Portal.
- "NLM Catalog record – Journal of Magnetic Resonance Imaging". National Library of Medicine.
- "WorldCat record (OCLC 22469246)". WorldCat.
