= Albert Macovski =

American engineer

- Born: 1929 (age 96–97)
- Education: New York University; Stanford University
- Scientific career
- Thesis: Efficient Holography Using Temporal Modulation (1968)
- Academic advisors: Joseph W. Goodman
- Doctoral students: John M. Pauly

Albert Macovski is an American Professor (Emeritus) at Stanford University, known for his many innovations in the area of imaging, particularly in the medical field.

== Education ==
Macovski graduated from NYU Poly in 1953 and got his PhD from Stanford University for research supervised by Joseph W. Goodman.

== Research and career ==
Macovski has over 150 patents and has authored over 200 technical articles. His innovations include the single-tube color camera and real-time phased array imaging for ultrasound. He has also made significant contributions to magnetic resonance imaging (MRI), computerized axial tomography (CAT scans), and digital radiography. His former doctoral students include John M. Pauly.

=== Awards and honors ===
Macovski's honors include founding fellow of the American Institute for Medical and Biological Engineering, the IEEE Zworykin Award, and the gold medal of the International Society of Magnetic Resonance.
