= Christiane K. Kuhl =

Radiology scientist (born 1966)

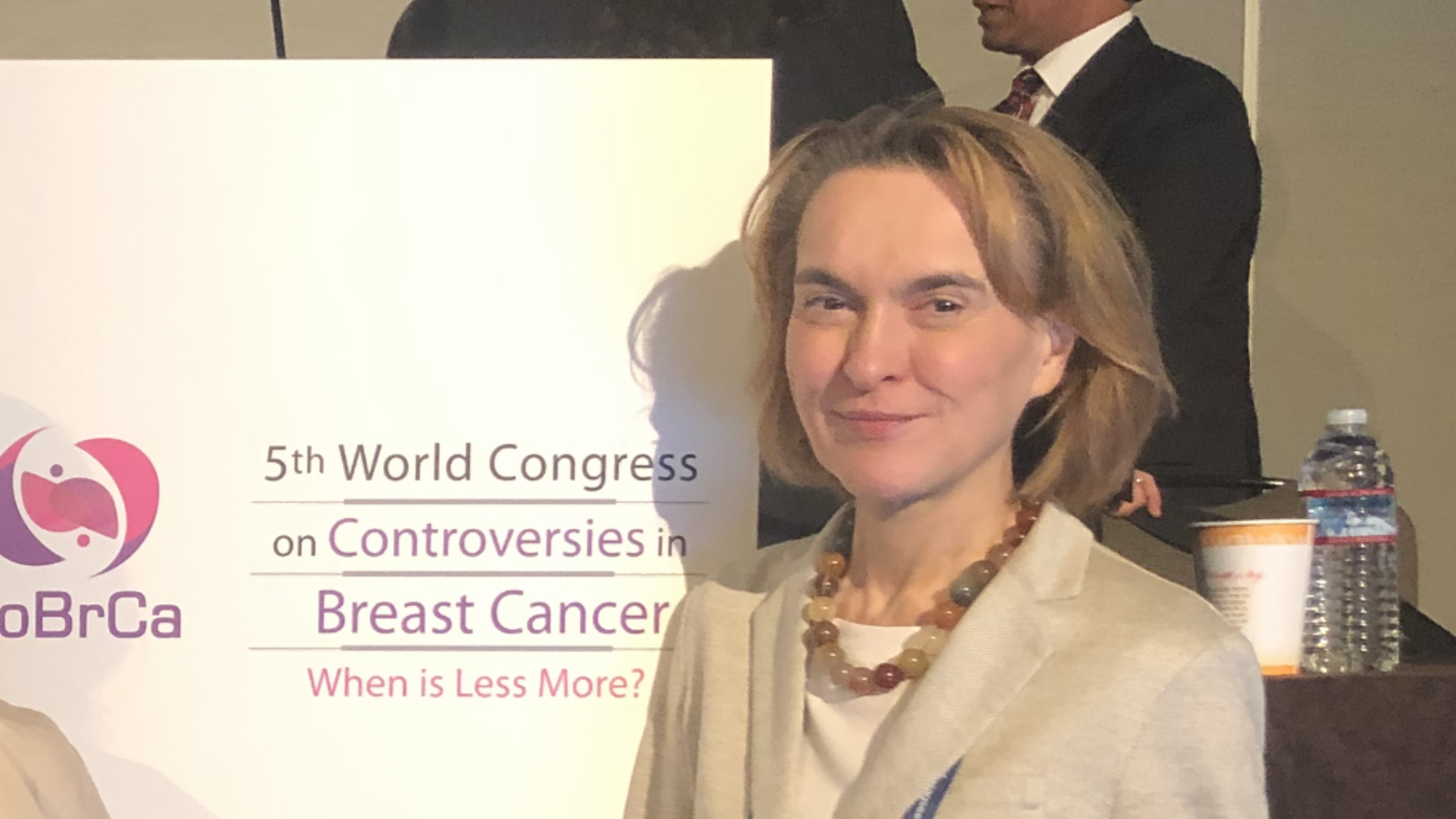
- Kuhl at the 5th World Congress on Controversies in Breast Cancer
- Born: 1966 (age 59–60); Bonn, West Germany
- Occupation: Scientist
- Scientific career
- Fields: Radiology

Christiane K. Kuhl (born 1966 in Bonn, West Germany) is a German scientist at RWTH Aachen University. She is Head of the Department of Radiology.

== Career ==
Kuhl's research focuses on the improvement of MRI scanning in the detection of breast cancer. She is a member of the Radiological Society of North America and the American Society of Clinical Oncology.

In 2019 she became a member of the German Academy of Sciences Leopoldina.

== Political positions ==
Ahead of the Christian Democrats' leadership election in 2021, Kuhl publicly endorsed Norbert Röttgen to succeed Annegret Kramp-Karrenbauer as the party’s chair.
