= John M. Pauly =

American magnetic resonance imaging engineer

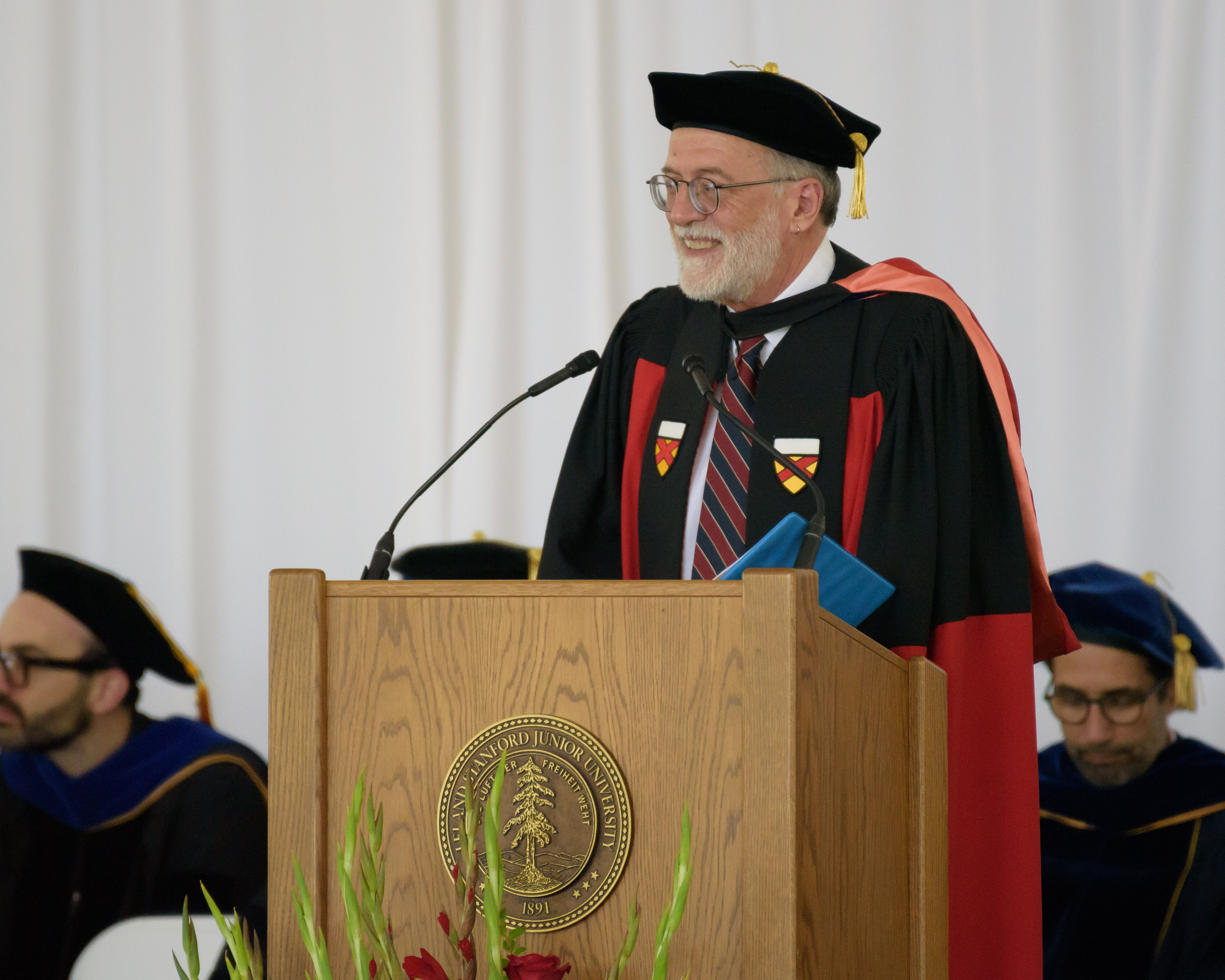
- Born: John Mark Pauly
- Education: Iowa State University (BS); Carnegie-Mellon University (MS); Stanford University (PhD)
- Scientific career
- Fields: Magnetic resonance imaging Medical imaging Signal processing Image reconstruction
- Thesis: New Approaches to Selective Excitation for Magnetic Resonance Imaging (1990)
- Doctoral advisor: Albert Macovski
- Doctoral students: Karla Miller
- Website: profiles.stanford.edu/john-pauly

John Mark Pauly is the Reid Weaver Dennis Professor of Engineering in the Department of Electrical Engineering at Stanford University. He is co-director of the Magnetic Resonance Systems Research Laboratory (MRSRL), which designs improved MRI techniques and equipment. He is Advisor to Stanford Student Space Initiative.

== Education ==
Pauly completed a Bachelor of Science degree in Electrical Engineering (EE) from Iowa State University in 1979. In 1981, a Master of Science in EE from Carnegie-Mellon University, and in 1990, completed his PhD from Stanford Department of Electrical Engineering where his PhD was supervised by Albert Macovski.

== Research and career ==
Pauly joined Stanford as a research associate in 1990. He joined the electrical engineering faculty in 2001.

Pauly's research areas include magnetic resonance imaging, medical imaging, signal processing, and image reconstruction. He is Advisor to Stanford Student Space Initiative.

Particularly in image reconstruction, fast imaging methods, pulse sequence and RF pulse design. Pauly led the Real-time MRI effort in the 1990s. His former doctoral students include Karla Miller and Michael Lustig.

As of July 2019, Pauly has been granted approximately 66 patents. He is also a registered US Patent agent.

Pauly is also involved with Stanford Amateur Radio Club, W6YX. He is a registered FCC Extra Class Amateur Radio License (AG6WH). He offers a course for students interested in obtaining a license.

=== Awards and honors ===
- 2012 Gold Medal, International Society of Magnetic Resonance in Medicine
- 2014 Fellow, American Institute of Medical and Biological Engineering (AIMBE)
- 2005 Fellow, International Society of Magnetic in Medicine
