= John J. Pauly =

Dr. John J. Pauly became provost of Marquette University in 2008. He had served as dean of the J. William and Mary Diederich College of Communication at Marquette for two years before becoming provost, and had been chair for nine years of the communications department at Saint Louis University, where he was honored twice for excellence in teaching. Pauly's areas of academic interest include the history and sociology of the mass media, the theory and practice of literary journalism, and cultural approaches to communication research.

== Education ==
Pauly received a Bachelor of Science in journalism with honors in 1972, a Master of Science in journalism in 1974, and a Ph.D. in communication in 1979, all from the University of Illinois at Urbana-Champaign.
