= Modic changes =

Pathological changes in the vertebrae

Modic changes are pathological changes in the bones of the spine, the vertebrae. These changes are situated in both the body of the vertebrae and in the end plate of the neighboring disc. Clinically, Modic Changes are often associated with constant lower back pain during the day, with peak pain occurring during the night and in the morning, coupled with back stiffness.

Modic changes have been observed in approximately 6% of the general adult population regardless of ethnicity. Modic changes are rare in children and young adults. From the age of 25 to 40 years, there is a steep increase in their prevalence, which levels out about 40 years of age and is stable until 80+ years. Modic changes are estimated to affect approximately 349 million of the adult population worldwide.[July 2021 est.]

Modic changes is a descriptive term used by radiologists in MRI evaluations. Conventional treatment including physiotherapy, chiropractic, acupuncture, and exercise for back pain, are not effective in treating Modic changes. Conversely, long term antibiotic treatment has been shown to be an effective treatment if done effectively.

== Signs and symptoms ==
Several studies have shown a relationship between Modic changes in the spinal vertebrae and pain in the lower back.

=== Long term chronic pain ===
The last decade of studies on Modic changes have shown that Modic changes are associated with many treatment-resistant pain episodes and may result in patients entering a state of chronic low back pain. On average, individuals with Modic changes have had chronic pain for longer than individuals suffering from non-Modic changes back pain.

=== Nightly Pain ===
Peak pain tends to occur late at night and in the morning. Late-night pain often results in poor and interrupted sleep.

=== Morning pain and stiffness ===
Many individuals suffering from Modic changes, tend to have a high degree of morning stiffness in the back. The duration of the stiffness in the morning also tends to be longer compared to individuals with no Modic changes.

=== Pain with lumbar hyperextension ===
Individuals with Modic changes experience exacerbation of pain when performing a hyperextension of the back. A hyperextension of the back is the equivalent of performing an excessive backward bending of the back beyond its natural position.

== Causes and Prevalence ==
Modic changes are a non-specific pathoanatomical marker observed on an MRI scan. For example, high blood pressure or high body temperature can be markers of several diseases. In 2008 the first hypothesis suggesting three possible pathogenetic reasons for Modic changes was published, a bacterial, a mechanical, and a rheumatological cause.

=== Bacteria as a cause ===
The bacterial cause is where the development of Modic change is due to an infection in the adjacent disc. A tear in the outer fibers of a disc may well initiate this infection. A disc herniation will result in a new local capillarization around the extruded material as the body attempts to remove the extruded material and inflammation with macrophages which are present in abundance. The mucous membrane of the gums is slightly damaged during ordinary tooth brushing, and anaerobic bacteria Propionibacterium acnes type 2 from the mouth enters the bloodstream.

The anaerobic bacteria can enter the disc through the breach, causing a low virulent and slowly developing infection. Since the disc is an avascular structure, it is an ideal environment for the growth of anaerobic bacteria. Propionibacterium acnes bacteria secrete propionic acid, which can dissolve fatty bone marrow and bone. Therefore, it was hypothesized that diffusion of propionic acid from the disc into the vertebrae results in bone oedema, i.e. Modic changes.

The first study by Stirling and Lambert found Propionibacterium acnes in the extruded disc material in patients undergoing surgery inspired the bacterial theory. The discovery has led to many studies trying to identify bacteria in the disc material. The methods used in the studies to determine the presence of bacteria vary significantly from very primitive methods such as simple culturing to highly sophisticated methods, where independent research groups utilizing staining techniques with fluorescence in situ hybridization were able to visualize bacteria from an ongoing infection as well as associated inflammatory cells. These studies were carried out in real time and therefore demonstrated an ongoing bacterial infection. The results of these studies have been reproduced in several systematic reviews, concluding that 30-34 % of patients with a disc herniation have bacteria in the extruded disc material.

=== Mechanical ===
Mechanical Modic changes might initially reflect bleeding, oedema, and vascularization following trauma or oedema associated with the repair process after micro-fractures within the endplate and the vertebral bone. Another possibility is that the toxic nucleus tissue (from the center of the discs) invades the endplate and vertebral bone through fractures in the endplates and causes an inflammatory response. It may be nucleus material entering the vertebrae, but Crock et al. also suggested that after a disc is damaged, irritating substances are produced, draining into the vertebral body, and causing an autoimmune reaction. This mechanical theory is supported by the fact that histological findings of the Modic Changes demonstrate disruption of the endplates with evidence of chronic inflammation. This in turn suggests that this erosion weakens the bone matrix, giving rise to stress fractures and consequent oedema. The universal reaction of bone under stress is seen in fractures wherever they occur and is always associated with pain.

=== Prevalence ===
Modic changes have been observed in approximately 6% of the general adult population regardless of ethnicity. Modic changes are rare in children and young adults. From the age of 25 to 40 years, there is a steep increase in their prevalence, which levels out about 40 years of age and is stable until 80+ years. Modic changes are estimated to affect approximately 349 million of the adult population worldwide.[July 2021 est.]

=== Modic changes do not disappear ===
The natural development of Modic changes was observed in an extensive study of almost 800 English twins. These twins had an initial MRI diagnosing them with Modic changes and another MRI 10 years later. No treatment was given, thus only observing the development of Modic changes. The study showed that only 3.5% of the people who had Modic changes initially demonstrated that they had disappeared after ten years. Unfortunately, most of the Modic changes do not resolve spontaneously.

=== Diagnosing Modic changes ===
Modic changes are observed on MRI (magnetic resonance imaging) scans. Bone oedema in other bones is not categorized into different types, but Dr. Michael Modic was the first to classify, describe and define Modic changes into three types. The different types were first described and defined in 1988.

Normal bone contains internal scaffolding, called trabeculae. Red bone marrow, which produces blood cells, is located in the hollows between the trabeculae.

- Modic changes Type 1 reflects oedema adjacent to the disc, fissured endplates, microfractures of the trabeculae, granular tissue, high levels of immunoreactive nerve fibers, and TNF alpha cells (pro-inflammatory)
- Modic changes Type 2 contains high levels of fat associated with degeneration of the bone marrow, microfractures of the trabeculae, disruption of the endplates, and immunoreactive nerve fibers and TNF alpha cells. A mix of Type 1 and Type 2 have frequently been observed in the exact Modic change.
- Modic Change type 3 is rare and suggests a more stable sclerotic phase.

The proof of an ongoing pathologic process in a Modic change has been documented by SPECT analysis [Isotope scanning using single positron emission computerized tomography], combined with high-resolution CT imaging. This method has shown high metabolic activity in 96.1% of endplates with Modic change type I and 56% with Modic change type 2.

Modic changes have been observed in dogs.

Structural changes of the vertebral endplates, including sclerosis, may be identified on imaging studies and can sometimes be confused with neurological conditions during evaluation. However, these findings are distinct from demyelinating disorders such as multiple sclerosis, as they involve degenerative changes in bone and adjacent tissues rather than immune-mediated damage to the central nervous system.

== Treatment ==
=== Exercise and surgery alone are ineffective treatments for patients with Modic changes ===
The most commonly recommended treatment for long-lasting pain in the lower back are exercises and fitness training usually under the supervision of a qualified clinician. This treatment does help the vast majority of back pain patients but does not have a pain-relieving effect on Modic changes or pain from Modic changes.

Modic changes are also an independent predictive marker for poor clinical outcomes, meaning that conventional treatments such as strength training, manipulations, physiotherapy, and surgery do not reduce the pain of individuals with Modic changes.

=== Treatment with antibiotics ===
In the case that body tissue is infected with bacteria, this will, in most cases, lead to the patient being given treatment with antibiotics, which in most cases will cure the infection. A research group led by Gilligan has presented a description of how they hypothesize 4 stages, from infection of the discus to developing Modic changes in the vertebrae.

The first study to investigate the efficacy of long-term antibiotic treatment for patients with Modic changes was published in 2013. This clinically randomized controlled trial showed this treatment to be a highly efficacious treatment for this subgroup of patients with chronic low back pain and Modic changes. Since then, in total, 10 studies have been conducted evaluating the effect of antibiotic treatment in patients with chronic low back pain and Modic changes. Two clinically controlled studies with long-term follow-up and one clinically controlled study with short-term follow-up have been performed. In addition, seven cohort studies have been completed, of which there are follow-up results in the six of the studies.

Differences in the efficacy of antibiotics in treating Modic changes with antibiotics warrants further investigation of optimal treatment protocol with antibiotics and diagnosis. Treatment is generally not offered to individuals with modic changes in the healthcare system due to the lengthy process between new scientific knowledge and its acceptance and optimal application in the healthcare system.

== Bibliography ==
- Modic MT, Steinberg PM, Ross JS, et al. (1988). "Degenerative disk disease: assessment of changes in vertebral body marrow with MR imaging". Radiology. 166 (1): 193–9. doi:10.1148/radiology.166.1.3336678. PMID 3336678.
- Modic MT, Masaryk TJ, Ross JS, Carter JR (1988). "Imaging of degenerative disk disease". Radiology. 168 (1): 177–86. doi:10.1148/radiology.168.1.3289089. PMID 3289089.
- Albert HB (Jul 2007). "Modic changes following lumbar disc herniation."". Eur. Spine J. 16 (7): 977–82. doi:10.1007/s00586-007-0336-8. PMC 2219661. PMID 17334791.
- https://ama.com.au/ausmed/back-pain-breakthrough-crippled-doubt
- Bråten LCH (Aug 2019). "Efficacy of antibiotic treatment in patients with chronic low back pain and Modic changes (the AIM study): double blind, randomised, placebocontrolled, multicentre trial."". BMJ. 367 l5654. doi:10.1136/bmj.l5654. PMC 6812614. PMID 31619437.
- http://dx.doi.org/10.1136/bmj.l5654
