= International Society for Magnetic Resonance in Medicine =

Nonprofit professional society for magnetic resonance in medicine and biology

The International Society for Magnetic Resonance in Medicine (ISMRM) is a "multi-disciplinary nonprofit association that promotes innovation, development, and application of magnetic resonance techniques in medicine and biology throughout the world". The society was originally called Society of Magnetic Resonance in Medicine, but on 1 January 1994 it merged with Society of Magnetic Resonance Imaging to form the Society of Magnetic Resonance. In 1996, it renamed itself the International Society of Magnetic Resonance in Medicine.

The Society has over 9,000 members and is based in Concord, California, United States. It publishes two journals, Magnetic Resonance in Medicine and Journal of Magnetic Resonance Imaging, as well as conference proceedings.

== Proceedings ==
Proceedings of the International Society of Magnetic Resonance in Medicine
- Discipline: Magnetic resonance imaging; Magnetic resonance spectroscopy
- Language: English

Publication details
- Former name: Proceedings of the Society of Magnetic Resonance
- History: 1982–present
- Publisher: Society of Magnetic Resonance in Medicine (United States)
- Frequency: Annual

Standard abbreviations
- ISO 4: Proc. Int. Soc. Magn. Reson. Med.

Indexing
- ISSN: 1065-9889 (print); 1557-3672 (web)
- LCCN: sv95001766
- OCLC no.: 26823906

Links
- Online access

The Proceedings of the International Society of Magnetic Resonance in Medicine is the official annual meeting abstract book of the society, published since 1982. The serial was initially titled Scientific Program of the Society of Magnetic Resonance in Medicine, then was renamed Book of Abstracts of the Society of Magnetic Resonance in Medicine in 1985. Following the merger of the Society of Magnetic Resonance in Medicine and the Society of Magnetic Resonance Imaging to form the Society of Magnetic Resonance in 1994, the name was changed to Proceedings of the Society of Magnetic Resonance, and finally in 1996 Proceedings of the International Society of Magnetic Resonance in Medicine.

Digitized versions of the Proceedings are available through the ISMRM archive. Access is currently open for volumes from 1982 to 2023; beginning in 2024 access is limited to meeting registrants, with 2025 access restricted to society members only.

== See also ==
- List of International Society for Magnetic Resonance in Medicine gold medal winners
