= July 1977 =

Month of 1977

<<	July 1977					>>
Su	Mo	Tu	We	Th	Fr	Sa
					1	2
3	4	5	6	7	8	9
10	11	12	13	14	15	16
17	18	19	20	21	22	23
24	25	26	27	28	29	30
31

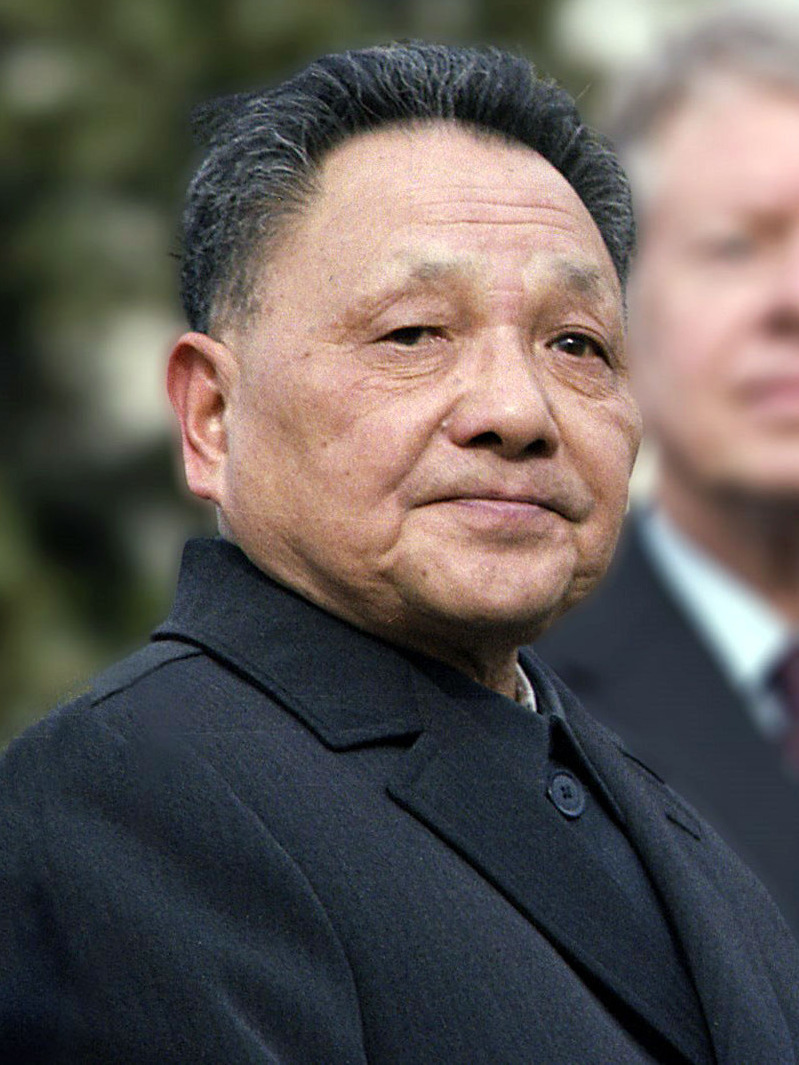
July 22, 1977: Deng Xiaoping restored to power by Chinese Communist Party

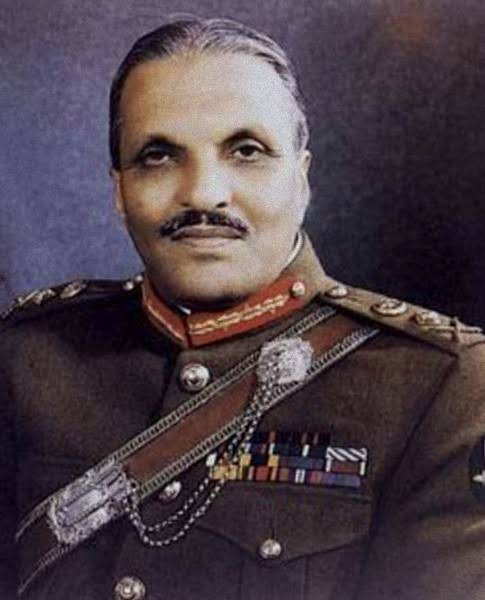
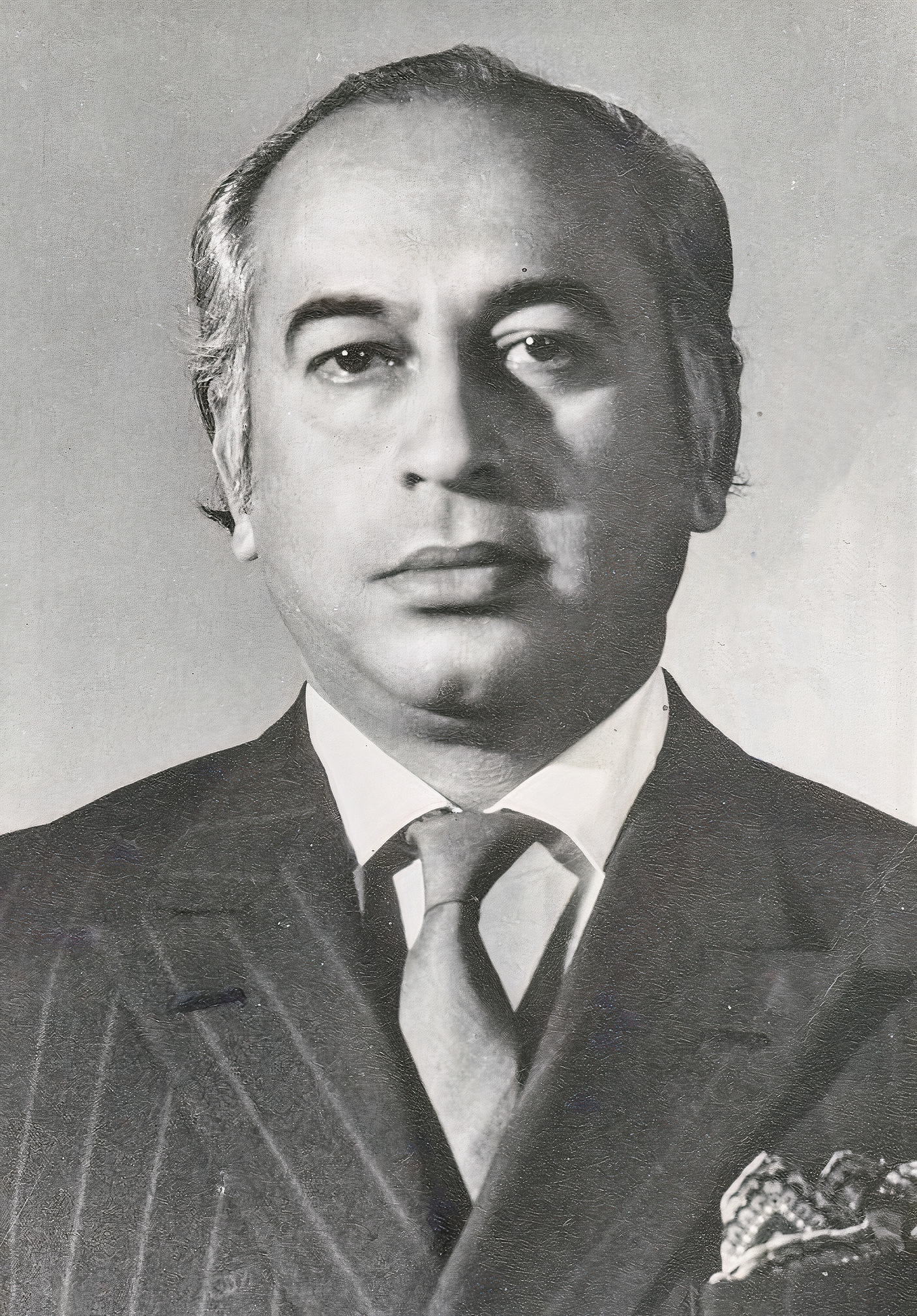
July 5, 1977: Pakistan's General Zia overthrows Prime Minister Bhutto

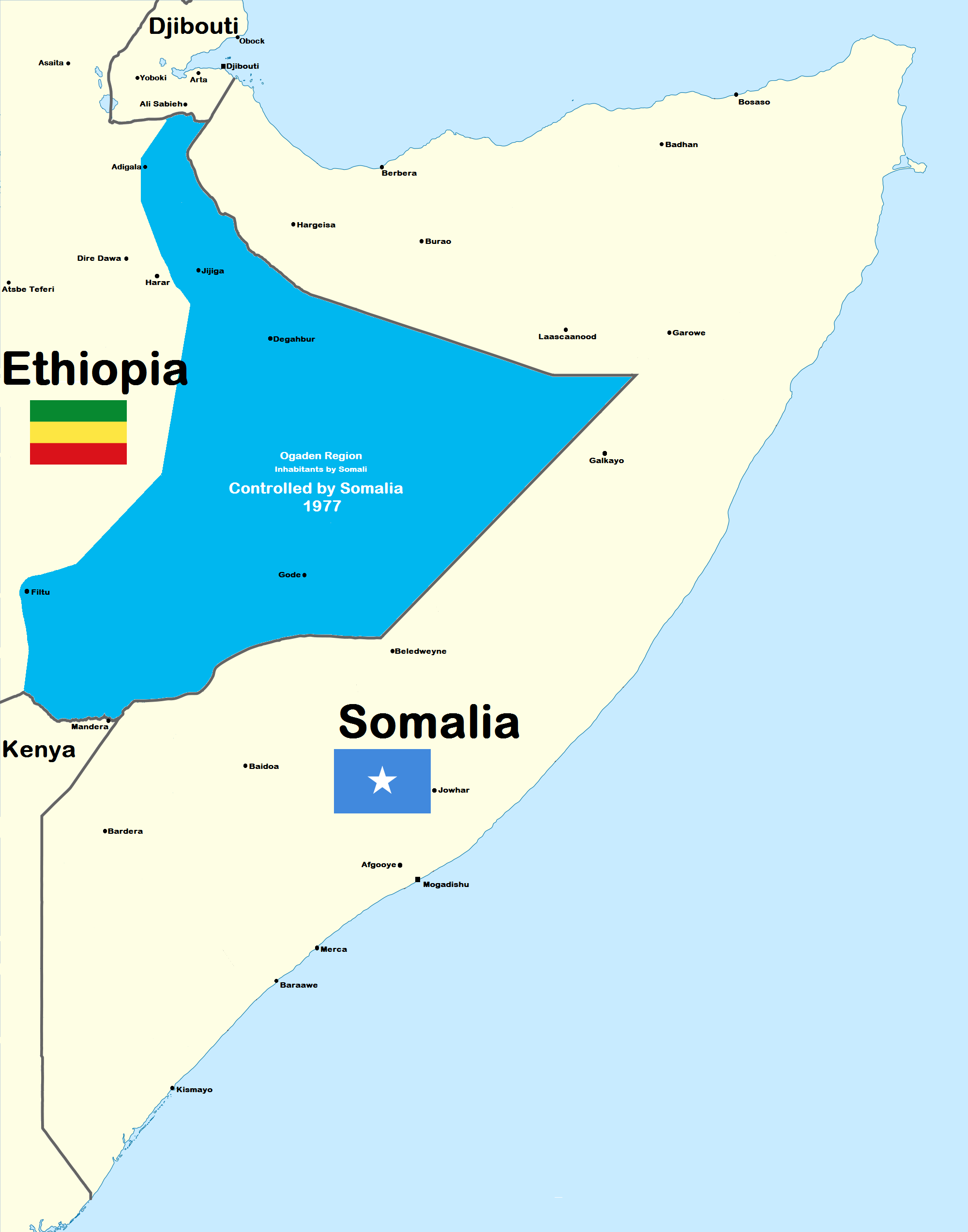
July 12, 1977: Somalia begins Ogaden War by invading Ethiopia to claim "Greater Somalia" (in blue)

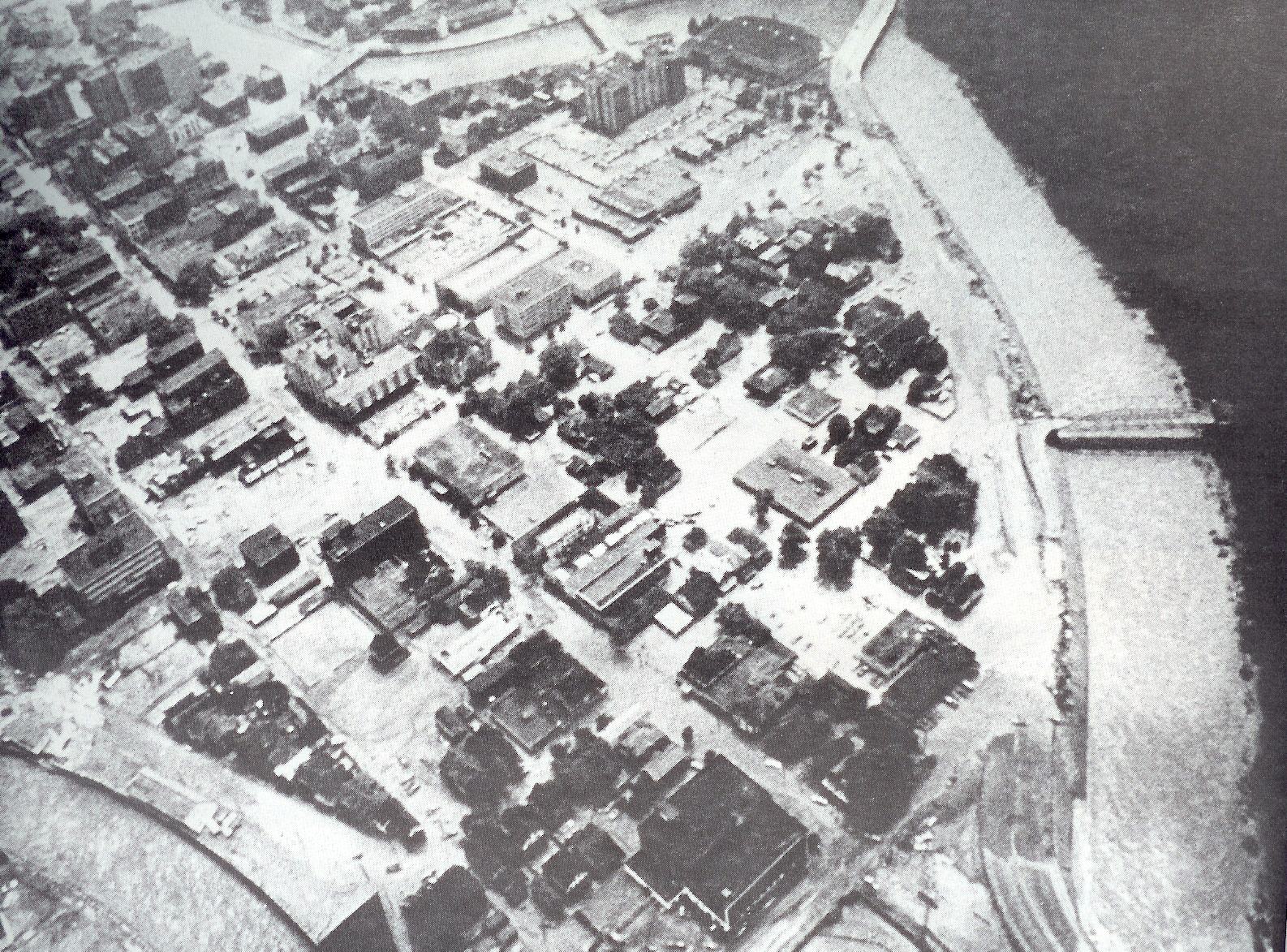
July 20, 1977: Johnstown, Pennsylvania flood kills 84 people

The following events occurred in July 1977:

== July 1, 1977 (Friday) ==
- The last Railway Mail Service mail train in the U.S. completed its run, bringing an end to almost 113 years of service. The final train departed New York on Thursday, June 30 and arrived in Washington DC the next morning, after which the service was permanently discontinued. At its height, the RMS had 30,000 employees, while only 68 were left when the final train made its delivery. Starting in the 1950s, jet aircraft had gradually replaced the slower method of shipping mail by train.
- Uganda's dictator Idi Amin lifted restrictions that he had imposed on June 8, when he said that the remaining 240 British residents would not be allowed to leave the East African nation. The decision was announced on Radio Kampala.
- By a single vote, a proposal failed in the U.S. Senate to end all funding for development of an American neutron bomb. A motion by Senator Mark O. Hatfield of Oregon lost, 42 to 43.
- The U.S. Department of State announced that diplomatic relations with Cuba would be restored on September 1, when ten U.S. diplomats would be stationed in Havana and ten Cuban diplomats would open and office in Washington D.C.
- Serial killer Patrick Kearney of Redondo Beach, California, sought for the murder of eight people, voluntarily turned himself in at the office of the Riverside County Sheriff.
- The East African Community was dissolved.
- Tennis star Virginia Wade became the last British woman to win the women's singles title at Wimbledon. It was her third, and final Grand Slam win in tennis. After losing the first set, 4–6, in the best-2-of-3 Wade defeated Betty Stöve, Wade won the second set, 6–3, and the deciding set, 6–1.
- Born: Liv Tyler, American actress; in New York City

== July 2, 1977 (Saturday) ==
- In defiance of South Africa's apartheid laws of favored treatment for white citizens and of racial segregation, the Boy Scouts Association of South Africa combined its four branches (Boy Scouts Association, African Boy Scouts Association, Coloured Boy Scouts Association and Indian Boy Scouts Association) into a single Boy Scouts of South Africa organization. The decision took place at the Scouting associations' first multiracial convention, the Quo Vadis Conference in Pietermaritzburg.

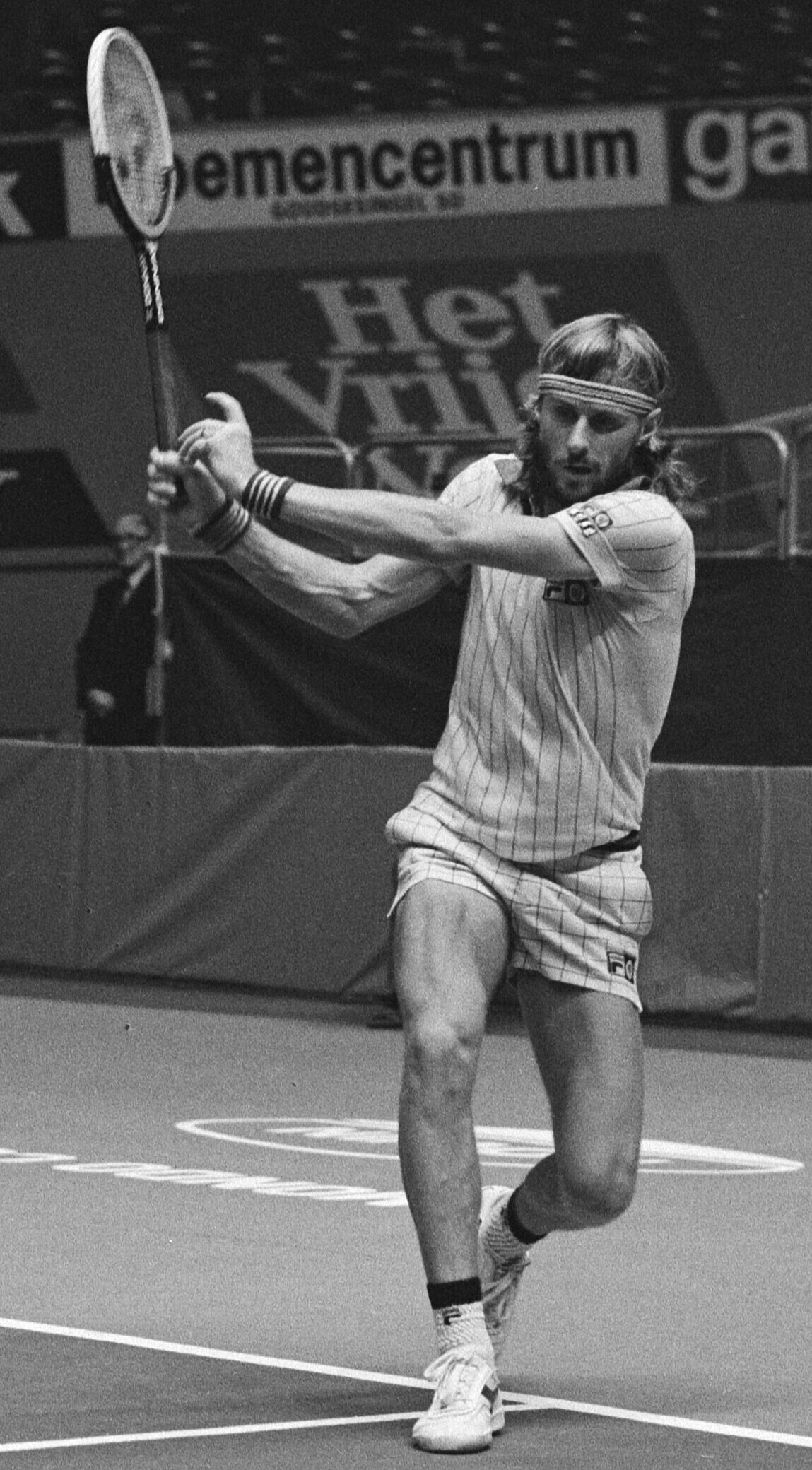
Björn Borg

- Björn Borg of Sweden won the men's singles title at Wimbledon, defeating Jimmy Connors of the U.S. in the best-3-of-5 series. Borg, who had won the 1976 Wimbledon title, lost the first and fourth match before defeating Connors in the deciding fifth, 3–6, 6–2, 6–1, 5-7 and 6–4.
- Born: Carl Froch, British professional boxer, world super-middleweight champion for the WBC (2008–2011), IBF (2012–2015) and WBA (2013–2015); in Nottingham
- Died:
  - Vladimir Nabokov, 78, Russian-born American novelist known for Lolita. Nabokov had been writing a new novel, The Opposite of Laura and had completed the equivalent of 30 manuscript pages (on 138 handwritten index cards) before becoming ill. His son Dmitri Nabokov would complete the manuscript more than 30 years later, and with the altered title of The Original of Laura, the book would be published in 2009 by Penguin Books and Knopf Publishing.
  - Gert Potgieter, 47, South African operatic tenor known for his performances in the operas Peter Grimes, In die Droogte and La bohème, was killed in a car accident.

== July 3, 1977 (Sunday) ==
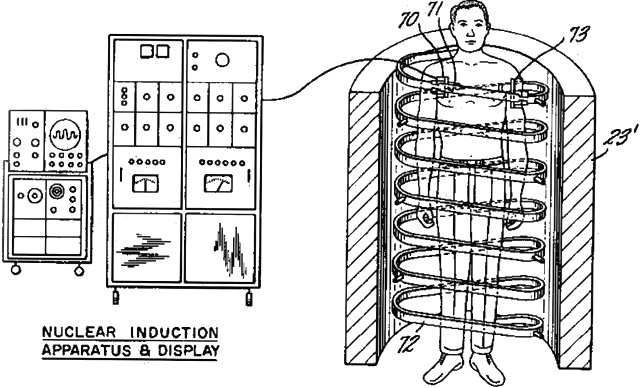
Dr. Damadian's MRI diagram

- The first MRI scan of a human being was performed with the use of magnetic resonance imaging by Dr. Raymond Damadian on Larry Minkoff, who had volunteered to be the test subject. The 5-hour process took place at the Downstate Medical Center of the State University of New York in Brooklyn. The imaging process would be perfected by Paul C. Lauterbur, a professor of chemistry at SUNY Stony Brook.
- Turkey's Prime Minister Bulent Ecevit resigned after losing a vote of no confidence in his government. Members of the Grand National Assembly of Turkey voted, 229 to 217, against Ecevit's Republican People's Party, which finished with the highest number of seats in the June 5 general election but fell short of a majority. After the vote, Ecevit drove to the presidential palace in Ankara to present his resignation to President Fahri Koruturk, but agreed to stay on as premier until a new government could be formed.
- Pakistan's Prime Minister Zulfikar Ali Bhutto received a warning from Major General K. M. Arif that Pakistan's military was planning a coup d'état, and was urged to negotiate with the opposition parties in the Pakistan National Alliance (PNA). Although Bhutto and the PNA leaders reached an agreement for new elections to be called, the coup would be carried out anyway.
- A pair of hired assassins shot and killed Haiti's Ambassador to Brazil as he was leaving a bar at the Meridien Hotel in the beach resort of Salvador. The two gunmen, who shot Delorme Mehu in the back, told police that they had been hired by Louis Robert Makensie, Haiti's secretary to President Jean-Claude Duvalier, to carry out the assassination.
- Soviet athlete Vladimir Yashchenko broke the world record for the high jump, clearing 7 feet, 7¾ inches, half an inch better than the mark of 7'7¼" set by Dwight Stones in 1976. Yashchenko's mark was set at the USSR-USA Junior track meet in Richmond, Virginia at the University of Richmond.
- The championship of Mexico's top soccer football league, the Primera División de México, was won by the UNAM Pumas of Mexico City, 1 to 0 over the Leones Negros of Guadalajara after the two teams had played to a 0-0 draw on June 29 in the two game series.
- A.C. Milan defeated Inter Milan, 2 to 0, to win the Coppa Italia, the playoff tournament of Italy's premier soccer football league. A.C. Milan had finished in tenth place in the regular season, while Inter Milan had placed fourth.
- Died: Gertrude Abercrombie, 68, American painter known as "the queen of the Bohemian artists"

== July 4, 1977 (Monday) ==
- The Nestlé boycott of products of the Swiss food manufacturer was inaugurated by the Infant Formula Action Coalition (INFACT) in the U.S. with an announcement in the U.S. from INFACT headquarters in Minneapolis. The boycott would become a worldwide campaign against Nestlé S.A. for its aggressive marketing of infant formulas as an alternative to breast milk in the world's poorest nations. The World Health Organization (WHO) had condemned the powdered infant formula in areas where the water supply was no sanitary. The INFACT boycott would be halted in 1984 after Nestlé changed its marketing strategy.
- At least 52 people in India drowned when a passenger ferry sank in the Ganges River
- At a ceremony at the U.S. National Archives in Washington D.C., museum curators sealed and hid away a "tricentennial time capsule", to be opened on July 4, 2075.
- Died: Muhammad Husayn al-Dhahabi, 64, the former Egyptian Minister of Religious Endowments, was "executed" two days after he had been kidnapped by the terrorist group Takfir wal-Hijra.

== July 5, 1977 (Tuesday) ==
- General Muhammad Zia-ul-Haq led a coup d'état to overthrow Zulfikar Ali Bhutto, who had been the first elected Prime Minister of Pakistan. The day before, Bhutto and other military chiefs had been guests at ceremonies at the U.S. Embassy in Islamabad for the U.S. independence day. Bhutto, his cabinet ministers, and opposition leaders were placed in "temporary protective custody" and General Zia announced that a four-member military council (himself and commanders of Pakistan's army, navy and air force) would rule the Asian nation until free elections could be held in October. The elections, however, did not take place. Bhutto and the other government members arrested were released on July 28 so that they could participate in the promised October elections, but Bhutto would be arrested again later.
- The Ugandan Army arrested playwright John Male, Uganda National Theatre director Dan Kintu, and an undersecretary of the Ugandan Ministry of Culture, Mark Sebuliba, after the staging of a play titled "The Office Is Empty". President Idi Amin inferred that the title of the play and the story was a reference to him, and the three men were charged with "insulting the president". After a trial by a military tribunal, Male, Kintu, and Sebuliba would be executed on July 24.

== July 6, 1977 (Wednesday) ==
- A flood off the Yan River killed 134 people in the city of Yan'an in China's Shaanxi province.
- The "Night of the Neckties", a mass roundup by the Argentine Army of six lawyers and eight of their family members in the city of Mar del Plata, was carried out. Only five survived after being taken to the GADA 601 detention center. Of the other eight, six became "desaparecidos" and were never seen again. The bodies of lawyers Jorge Candeloro and Norberto Centeno would be found later.
- Mexico's new agency for regulation and censorship of broadcasting and movies, the RTC (General Directorate for Radio, Television and Cinema) was founded. Mexico's President José López Portillo appointed his sister, Margarita López Portillo y Pacheco as the first RTC Director.
- Born:
  - Max Mirnyi, Belarusan tennis player with six Grand Slam doubles titles in the French Open (2005, 2006, 2011, 2012) and U.S. Open (2000, 2002); in Minsk, Byelorussian SSR, Soviet Union
  - Audrey Fleurot, French TV actress known for Un village français; in Mantes-la-Jolie, Yvelines département

== July 7, 1977 (Thursday) ==
- Fan Yuanye, a pilot of China's People's Liberation Army Air Force veered off course after taking off from Jinjiang and became the first person to deliver Communist China's new Shenyang J-6 fighter to the West. Fan, the third Chinese PLAAF pilot to defect to Taiwan, and the first since 1965, brought secret documents with him and was promised a reward of 5,000 ounces worth of gold, worth US$698,400 at that time. Six other pilots would defect while flying the J-6 between 1979 and 1990.
- The Marxist nation of Albania, led by Communist Party Chief Enver Hoxha, criticized "its only friend in the world", the People's Republic of China, as China worked on closer diplomatic ties with the United States. The official Communist Party newspaper, Zeri I Popullit, featured an editorial, apparently authored by Hoxha, that said that "'My enemy's enemy is my friend' cannot be applied when it is a matter of the two imperialist powers, the Soviet Union and the United States," adding that "The present theories about the so-called Third World and nonaligned countries are intended to curb the revolution and defend capitalism.". Three weeks later, Albania asked China to remove its military advisers from the Balkan nation.
- The reggae album Two Sevens Clash by the Jamaican group Culture and its songwriter and lead vocalist Joseph Hill, was released to coincide with the date 7/7/77, in anticipation of a prediction by Pan-Africanist leader Marcus Garvey that the date would be a time when chaos would ensue and wrongs would be righted. Although the prediction caused great concern in Jamaica, no unusual incidents occurred.
- The governing body of the San Diego chapter Hells Angels Motorcycle Club gang voted unanimously to declare war on the rival Mongols Motorcycle Club gang in a dispute over territory in southern California. Over the summer, four Mongols members and a 15-year-old boy would be killed, and six others injured in shootings and bombings. In October, 32 members of the San Diego Hells Angels chapter would be arrested.

== July 8, 1977 (Friday) ==
- The offices of the Church of Scientology in Los Angeles and Hollywood, California and in Washington, D.C. were raided by the Federal Bureau of Investigation (FBI) to seize evidence that the Church's security department, the Guardian's Office, was masterminding illegal activities. The raid, one of the largest by the FBI up to that time, gathered information that led to the arrest of 11 senior members of the Church of Scientology for conspiracy against the United States.
- The first fatal accident on the Trans-Alaska Pipeline System occurred less than three weeks after the Alaska Pipeline began transporting crude oil. One worker was killed and five others injured while making repairs south of Fairbanks at Pump Station number 8, because the flow of oil had not been completely turned off while the pipe was being worked on. The pipeline was reopened on July 18 by the U.S. Department of the Interior.
- Born:
  - Wang Zhizhi, Chinese professional basketball player who was the first Chinese citizen to play in the NBA (2001 to 2005) and the 2000 Chinese Basketball Association MVP; in Beijing
  - Milo Ventimiglia, American TV actor known for This Is Us and for Heroes; in Anaheim, California
- Died:
  - Josef Nádvorník, 71, Czech biologist and authority on lichens, for whom the lichen genus Nadvornikia and various species of other genera (including Bryoria nadvornikiana, the blonde horsehair lichen) are named
  - Tiger Sarll, 94, British war correspondent and adventurer

== July 9, 1977 (Saturday) ==
- The Pinochet dictatorship in Chile organized the Acto de Chacarillas youth event, a patriotic ritual modeled on similar pro-government rallies held in Spain during the reign of Francisco Franco.
- Three weeks of voting was completed in Papua New Guinea for the first elections held since independence. Voting took place for all 109 seats of the National Parliament from June 18 to July 9. While no party attained the 55 seats needed for a majority, a coalition was formed from Prime Minister Michael Somare's Pangu Party and the People's Progress Party, along with several independent candidates.
- Spain's government legalized the Carlist Party, which had as its agenda to replace the Borbon y Borbon King Juan Carlos with pretender Carlos Hugo, Duke of Parma.
- Tom Watson won golf's British Open by a single stroke, defeating runner-up Jack Nicklaus, 268 to 269.

== July 10, 1977 (Sunday) ==
- The hottest weather ever recorded in Europe was experienced in Greece as thermometers registered 48.0 °C (118.4 °F) in the shade at noon in Elefsis.
- Voting was held in Japan for the 252 seats of the House of Councillors (the Sangiin), the upper house of Japan's parliament, the National Diet. Prime Minister Takeo Fukuda's Liberal Democratic Party lost two seats but still retained 124, three less than a majority.
- Born
  - Chiwetel Ejiofor, British stage, film and TV actor, BAFTA Award winner known for Twelve Years a Slave; in London
  - Cary Joji Fukunaga, American film director known for No Time to Die, 2014 Primetime Emmy Award winner; in Oakland, California

== July 11, 1977 (Monday) ==
- The United Republic of Cameroon's government restored the traditional African tribal chieftaincies that had been abolished prior to independence, as President Ahmadou Ahidjo issued Decree #77/609. Among the rulers given authority were Seidou Njimoluh Njoya, Sultan of the Bamum people with a capital of Foumban; and Angwafo III, the Fon of Mankon with a capital at Bamenda.
- Don Revie, the unpopular manager of the England national football team, resigned three years into his five-year contract and announced that he had accepted a job to coach the relatively new team of the United Arab Emirates. The team had failed to qualify for the UEFA Euro 1976 championship tournament and would be eliminated from the 1978 FIFA World Cup later in the year.
- Born: Li Zimeng, Chinese TV newscaster; in Shenyang, Liaoning province
- Died:
  - Alice Paul, 92, American suffragist and feminist
  - Yevgeny Karelov, 45, Soviet film director, died of heart failure while swimming in the Black Sea.
  - Francesco Nagni, 80, Italian sculptor

== July 12, 1977 (Tuesday) ==
- The Ogaden War began as the Somali National Army began a full-scale invasion of neighboring Ethiopia's desert region with the world's second largest population of ethnic Somalis. Within three months after the invasion, Somalia had captured 120,000 square miles (310,000 km^{2}) of territory, or 90% of the Ogaden desert. Ethiopia would make a counterattack with the assistance of soldiers from Cuba, and would repel the Somali invasion by March 23, 1978.
- Born:
  - Steve Howey, American TV and film actor; in San Antonio, Texas
  - Brock Lesnar, American-born Canadian professional wrestler and mixed martial artist; in Webster, South Dakota
- Died: Osmín Aguirre y Salinas, 87, former President of El Salvador from 1944 to 1945, was shot and fatally wounded outside of his home in San Salvador. He died en route to the nation's military hospital.

== July 13, 1977 (Wednesday) ==
- At 9:34 p.m., a blackout shut off electric in all five boroughs of New York City, the largest city in the U.S., and parts of suburban Westchester County. The failure of the Consolidated Edison Company (Con Ed) system left an estimated 12,000,000 people in darkness and shut down the subway system, commuter trains, elevators and all electric appliances. The blackout, coming on one of the hottest and most humid nights of the summer, became an opportunity for looting, vandalism and arson until power was restored 25 hours later, and 3,377 people were arrested. By contrast, there were fewer than 100 arrests in the blackout of November 9, 1965.
- Born: Kari Wahlgren, American voice actress; in Hoisington, Kansas
- Died: Count Carl Gustaf von Rosen, 67, Swedish aviator, humanitarian and mercenary, was killed in Ethiopia by Somali soldiers who overran the town of Gode during the Ogaden War. For 10 years after World War II, Colonel von Rosen commanded the Ethiopian Air Force at the request of Emperor Haile Selassie.

== July 14, 1977 (Thursday) ==
- In the largest anti-nuclear protest held in Spain, more than 150,000 demonstrators turned out in Bilbao against the Lemoniz Nuclear Power Plant, being constructed in Bizkaia province, populated largely by Spain's Basque minority. Construction would be halted in 1982.
- A U.S. Army Chinook CH-47 cargo helicopter with four people on board strayed across the Demilitarized Zone from South Korea and was shot down in North Korea. Three of the people on board were killed and a fourth was captured. The Chinook had departed from Pyongtaek and was bound for Gangneung, but veered northward despite warning shots fired from South Korean observation posts. After landing for the crew to inspect for possible damage, the helicopter flew southward again and was shot down 3.7 miles (6.0 km) inside North Korea. Two days later, North Korea freed the lone survivor, Chief Warrant Officer Glenn Schwanke, and released the bodies of the three other crew.
- At least 96 coal miners were killed in Colombia, and 40 more were trapped underground, after an explosion at Villa Diana.
- Sir John Kerr, who in 1975 had caused a major constitutional crisis by firing Prime Minister Gough Whitlam, announced that he would be retiring as Governor-General of Australia effective December 8.
- Born: Princess Victoria, heiress apparent to the throne of Sweden as the first child of King Carl XVI Gustaf; in Solna. The birth of Victoria Ingrid Alice Desiree of the House of Bernadotte marked "the first time a child was born to a reigning Swedish king and queen in 178 years, and the first time the delivery has taken place at a public hospital."

== July 15, 1977 (Friday) ==
- Mishaal bint Fahd Al Saud, 19, Saudi Arabian princess, great niece of King Khalid, was executed in public along with her lover, Khaled al Sha'er Muhalhal, after both were convicted of adultery. On instructions from her grandfather, Prince Muhammad bin Abdulaziz Al Saud, Princess Mishaal was shot to death outside of the Queen's Building in Jeddah, while Khaled Muhalhal was beheaded with a sword. Her death would be the subject of the 1980 British documentary Death of a Princess.
- The International Regulations for Preventing Collisions at Sea (abbreviated as COLREGS), signed by multiple nations in 1972, went into effect .
- Donald Mackay, whose information to Australian police had led to the largest drug bust in the nation's history up to that time, disappeared in Griffith, New South Wales after having drinks with a group of friends at a hotel. He was returning to his van at the hotel parking lot when he was apparently assaulted, dragged away and shot three times. His body would never be found and would still be missing more than 45 years later.
- Died: Konstantin Fedin, 85, Soviet Russian novelist and playwright known for Cities and Years

== July 16, 1977 (Saturday) ==
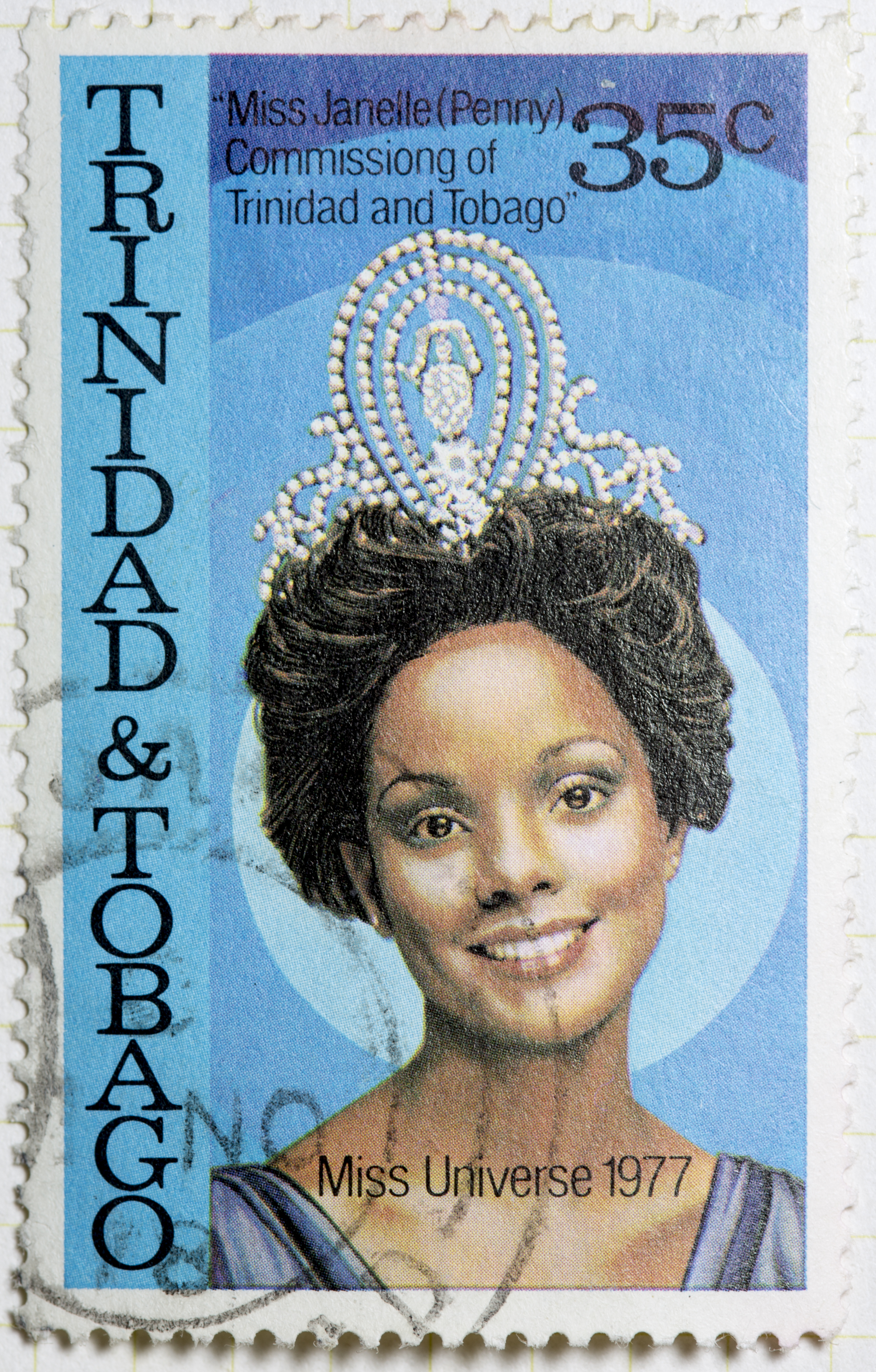
Miss Commissiong

- For the first time, a black contestant won the Miss Universe beauty pageant, as Janelle Commissiong, representing Trinidad and Tobago, was crowned at Santo Domingo in the Dominican Republic.
- Born: Javier Chillon, Spanish film director; in Madrid
- Died:
  - Dr. Douglas Reye, 65, Australian pathologist who was the first to identify the diseases Reye syndrome and nemaline myopathy, died of a ruptured aneurysm.
  - Robert M. Stanley, 64, American test pilot who was the first American to fly a jet aircraft and who later founded the Stanley Aviation company, was killed in the crash of a company-owned 1121 Jet Commander aircraft. Stanley, his two sons, his daughter-in-law and a son's fiancée were making an approach to Fort Lauderdale, Florida when the jet encountered severe wind shear and crashed into the ocean. Stanley had been the designer of the Yankee Safety System for a rocket powered ejection seat in airplanes that was "credited with saving 100 U.S. pilots' lives in Vietnam", but "died in the crash of a plane that had no escape system."

== July 17, 1977 (Sunday) ==
- In aerial combat between Ethiopia and Somalia, two Ethiopian F-5 fighters of the 9th Fighter Squadron were on patrol near Harer when they engaged with four Somali MiG-21 fighters. The Ethiopian F-5s shot down two of the Somali MiG-21s, while the other two MiGs collided in midair while attempting to avoid an air-to-air AIM-9B Sidewinder missile. During the summer, the Ethiopians would down 25 Somali jets with Sidewinder missiles.
- South Korea's government freed 14 dissidents from jail, among the 170 arrested under an emergency decree from President Park Chung-hee. More than 150 other government opponents remained incarcerated, including former presidential candidate Kim Dae Jung. "Dissident Release 'a Trick,' Korea Opposition Says", Los Angeles Times, July 19, 1977, p. I-12
- Born: Nina Kreutzmann Jørgensen, Greenlandic popular singer; in Godthåb, Greenland (now Nuuk, Kalaallit Nunaat)

== July 18, 1977 (Monday) ==
- Project Flower, a secret agreement between Israel and Iran for Israeli missiles to be supplied in exchange for Iranian oil, began as Iran's General Hassan Toufanian, the assistant Minister of War, arrived in Israel for meeting with Israel's Foreign Minister Moshe Dayan and Defense Minister Ezer Weizmann. In return for $280,000,000 worth of Iranian oil, Israel began developing anti-ship missiles similar to existing U.S. weapons.
- Rhodesia's Prime Minister Ian Smith dissolved parliament and scheduled elections for August 31, limited to white residents only in the minority ruled African nation.
- Protasio Montalvo Martin, the former Mayor of Cercedilla in Spain, near Madrid, emerged from his home after 38 years of hiding. Montalvo, a Socialist, had stayed in the basement of his house, coming up upstairs only occasionally to assist his wife in housework, but never ventured outside because he had been in fear of reprisal from the government of Francisco Franco.

== July 19, 1977 (Tuesday) ==
- Voting was held in the Bahamas for the 38 seats of the House of Assembly. The ruling Progressive Liberal Party (PLP), led by Prime Minister Lynden Pindling, increased its supermajority, winning 30 seats.
- In South Africa, the Transvaal province director of education announced that the province's white schoolchildren aged 10 to 12 would be required to attend classes to learn African languages, with black teachers instructing them. The most common of the Southern Bantu languages spoken in the Transvaal was Zulu, followed by Sotho, Tswana and Xhosa. The compulsory class was a first in the white-minority ruled African nation, which still limited the rights of black and mixed race residents as part of its apartheid laws.
- Egypt returned the bodies of 19 Israeli soldiers who had been killed in the 1973 Yom Kippur War, after Egypt's President Anwar Sadat told reporters that his decision was an unconditional demonstration of his desire for peace with Israel.
- The 24th and final studio album by Elvis Presley, Moody Blue, was released four weeks before his sudden death on August 16.
- Died: Brigadier General James C. Marshall, 79, the first U.S. Army Corps of Engineers director of the Manhattan Project

== July 20, 1977 (Wednesday) ==
- Flooding and the collapse of seven dams killed 84 people in the U.S. state of Pennsylvania after a rainfall of 12 inches (300 mm) in 24 hours. At 2:35 in the morning, the Laurel Run Dam collapsed and the waters of the Johnstown Reservoir swept away 39 residents of the unincorporated town of Tanneryville, Pennsylvania, 10 in the town of Dale and 35 others in 13 surrounding communities in Cambria County. The disaster was the product of a mesoscale convective complex that had originated four days earlier over the U.S. state of South Dakota before hovering over southwestern Pennsylvania.
- In the Soviet Union, all but one of the 40 people on board Aeroflot East Siberia Flight B-2 were killed when the Avia 14 airplane crashed on takeoff from Vitim, in the RSFSR with an intended destination of Irkutsk. Blown sideways by a crosswind, the aircraft failed to completely clear a wooden fence and stalled an at altitude of 100 feet (30 m) and then impacted a forest.
- Born: Alessandro Santos, Brazilian-born Japanese footballer with 82 caps for the Japan national team; in Maringá, Paraná state
- Died:
  - Carter DeHaven (stage name for Francis O'Callaghan), 90, American film actor
  - Karl Ristikivi, 64, Estonian language novelist

== July 21, 1977 (Thursday) ==
- In elections in Sri Lanka for all 168 seats of the unicameral National State Assembly, voters overwhelmingly rejected the Sri Lanka Freedom Party (SFLP) led by Prime Minister Sirimavo Bandaranaike, the world's only woman head of government. Though Bandaranaike retained her own seat in parliament, her SFLP went from 91 seats to only 8, while the United National Party of opposition leader Junius R. Jayewardene won went from 17 seats to 140.
- The Libyan–Egyptian War, sparked by a Libyan raid on Sallum, began. The next day, the Egyptian Air Force bombed a Libyan airbase south of Tobruk, 72 miles (116 km) inside Libya. The fighting lasted until July 24.
- At least 17 members of the Army of Thailand were killed in battle against Cambodian troops who inaded the border village of Noi Parai.
- Süleyman Demirel, of AP formed the new government of Turkey, a three-party coalition that called itself the "second national front" (Milliyetçi cephe).
- Born: Allison Wagner, American swimmer who held the world record in the women's 200-meter swim from 1993 to 2008; in Gainesville, Florida

== July 22, 1977 (Friday) ==
- Deng Xiaoping (referred to in the Western press at the time as Teng Hsiao-ping), who had been Vice Premier of the People's Republic of China (PRC) before being purged from the Chinese Communist Party in 1976, was restored to power nine months after the "Gang of Four" was expelled from power. The decision to restore Deng to the posts of Chief of Staff of the Chinese armed forces, Vice Chairman of the Chinese Communist Party (CCP), Vice Premier of the PRC, and Vice Chairman of the CCP Military Commission, was approved by the Central Committee of the CCP. Beijing television showed Deng, now the third-ranking Chinese leader, sitting on the right side of CCP Chairman Hua Guofeng and the second most powerful leader, Defense Minister Ye Jianying, sitting on Hua's left.
- Spain's King Juan Carlos I opened the first session of the newly-elected Cortes Generales, the first parliament in Spain since 1936 to have been freely elected.
- Pacific Southwest Airlines Flight 90, with 103 people on board, narrowly averted a mid-air collision when the pilot put the Lockheed Electra into a sudden dive to avoid a collision with a small private plane. The steep dive of 6,000 feet (1,800 m) in seconds injured 26 passengers who were thrown from their seats, but PSA Flight 90 landed safely at Los Angeles at the end of its travel from South Lake Tahoe.
- In Paris, the representatives of 23 Western nations agreed on a plan from the Council of the Organization for Economic Cooperation and Development for the dumping of radioactive waste in the Earth's oceans, a practice already in effect in the UK, the Netherlands, Belgium and Switzerland, and soon to start in Japan.

== July 23, 1977 (Saturday) ==
- The Bermuda II Agreement was signed between representatives of the United Kingdom and the United States as a renegotiating of a 1946 agreement that had been signed at Bermuda. Under the terms of the pact, only two U.S. airlines (Pan Am and TWA) were allowed to fly to and from London's Heathrow Airport, and a lone British airline (British Airways) could fly from Heathrow to specific U.S. cities.
- FM radio was introduced to India as the government-owned All India Radio began transmitting from a station in Madras (now called Chennai) in the Tamil Nadu state.
- Died: Arsenio Erico, 62, Paraguayan-born footballer who was the all-time career scorer in the Argentine Primera División, with 295 goals for Club Atlético Independiente

== July 24, 1977 (Sunday) ==
- In the U.S., representatives of the Comanche Nation (with a capital at Lawton, Oklahoma) and Ute nations signed a peace treaty in the small town of Ignacio, Colorado, capital of the Southern Ute Indian Reservation. The verbal pact to make peace had been agreed upon in the 1860s between Quanah Parker of the Comanches and Sapiah (Buckskin Charlie) of the Southern Utes, but ended in a gun battle with no conclusion.
- Kuwait and Iraq announced that they were reopening the border between their two nations, closed since 1972.
- An express train crashed into a passenger train that was stopped at the Jitan station in North Chungcheong province in South Korea, killing 19 people and injuring 125.
- Born: Mehdi Mahdavikia, Iranian soccer football player with 111 caps for the Iran National team; in Shahr-e Ray

== July 25, 1977 (Monday) ==
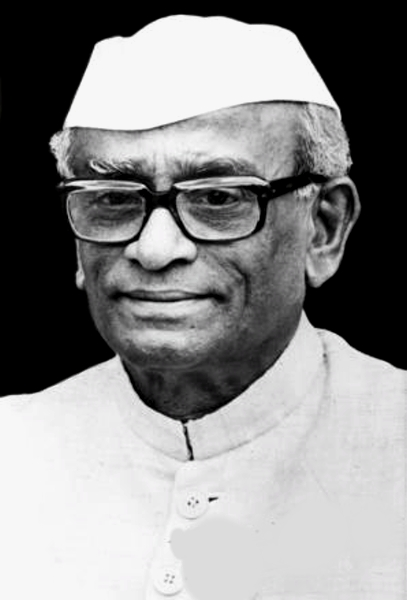
Reddy to be President of India

- Neelam Sanjiva Reddy was sworn in as the sixth President of India for a five-year term. The inauguration took place after Reddy, the Speaker of the House of the Lok Sabha, was declared on July 21 to be elected without opposition because no other candidates had sought nomination. A vote scheduled for August 6 was declared unnecessary.
- Egypt's President Anwar Sadat extended an invitation to all former Egyptian Jews to return home and pledged that the 100,000 who had moved away from Egypt since the founding of the State of Israel in 1948 would be granted full citizenship and equal rights with other Egyptians. The announcement, which came in an interview in the Cairo newspaper Al Ahram, was similar to announcements made by Morocco, Iraq, Sudan and Syria, and came after the Palestine Liberation Organization had campaigned for "Oriental Jews"— those who had immigrated to Israel from Arab nations— to be given incentives to return to the Arab world.
- Died: David Toro, 79, President of Bolivia from 1936 to 1937

== July 26, 1977 (Tuesday) ==
- The republics of Portugal and of Angola, a former Portuguese colony in Africa, reached an agreement for repatriation of black and white Angolan residents who had fled the country during the Angolan Civil War. A joint communique was issue from both Lisbon and Luanda pledging that the two countries would jointly request aid from the United Nations High Commissioner for Refugees.
- Brazil's President and dictator, Ernesto Geisel, issued a decree banning political broadcasts from radio and television. The South American nation's election laws provided that the ruling party and the only authorized opposition party were each allowed two hours of free air time per year.
- A forest fire that destroyed 200 homes in Montecito, California, began after a kite was blown by high winds into electrical power lines near the intersection of Coyote Road and Mountain Drive, and then spread by the winds into the unincorporated suburb of Santa Barbara. Stanley Roden, District Attorney for Santa Barbara County, California dismissed arson as a cause and revealed that it was an accident. "The strength of the wind caused the kite string handle to be wrested from the kite flier's hand," Roden said. "The handle wrapped itself around a cable TV wire directly below high tension wires; the force of the wind carried the kite and string forward so that a 16,000-volt line directly above the cable TV line arced with an adjacent high-tension wire." Roden said also that the kite-flyer was "a man in his early 20s" who was in seclusion outside of the city.
- Born:
  - Markwayne Mullin, American and Cherokee Nation citizen, U.S. Congressman 2013 to 2023 and U.S. Senator for Oklahoma since 2023, known also for being the fourth Native American to serve in the U.S. Senate and the first Cherokee U.S. senator since 1925; in Tulsa.
  - Rebecca St. James (stage name for Rebecca Jean Smallbone), Australian Christian singer and 1999 Grammy Award winner; in Sydney

== July 27, 1977 (Wednesday) ==
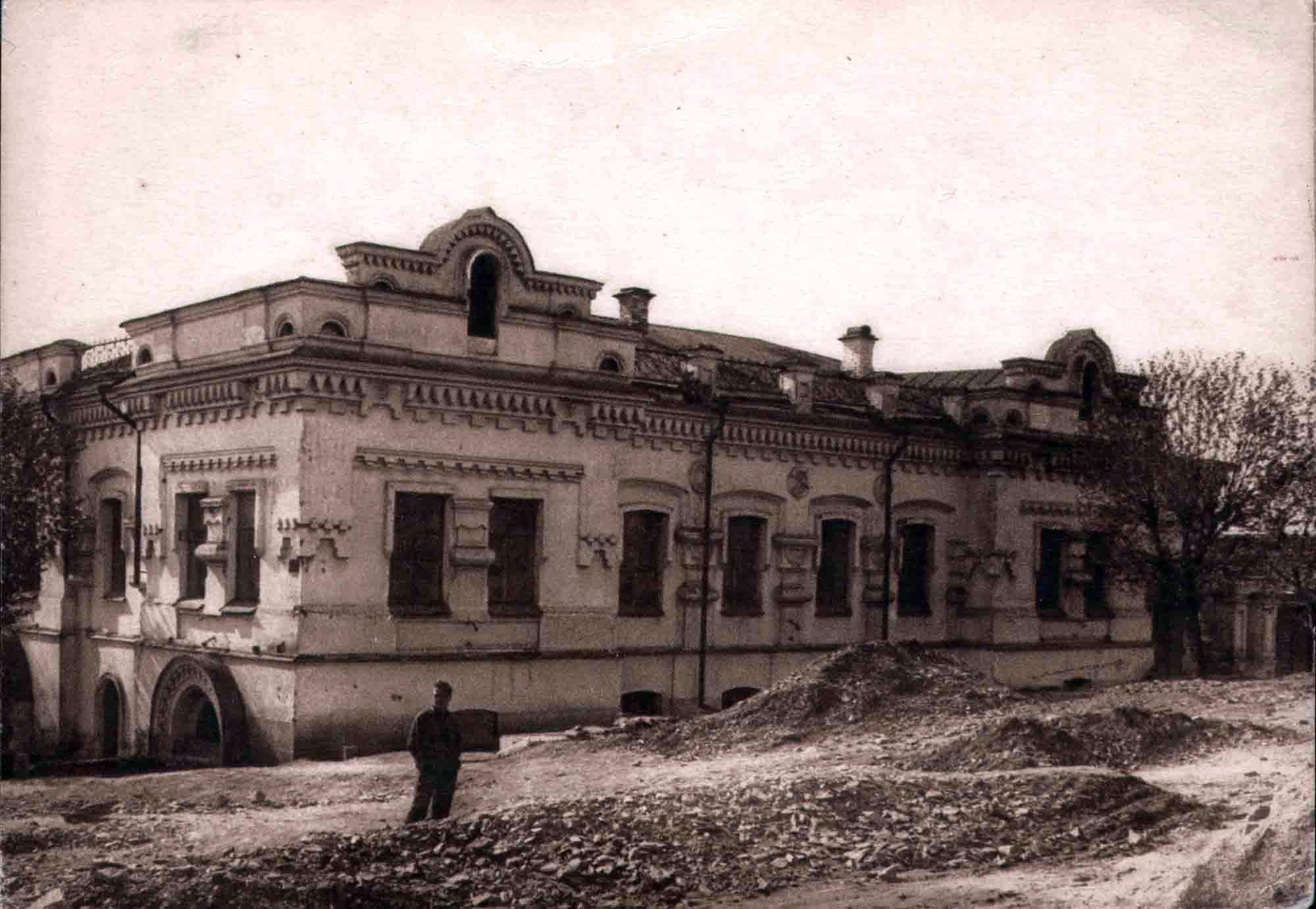
The Ipatiev House

- The Soviet Politburo ordered Boris Yeltsin to demolish the Ipatiev House, where Tsar Nicholas II of Russia and his family were shot in 1918. Yeltsin would later call the order a barbarian act.
- In Carol City, Florida, a suburb of Miami, John Errol Ferguson, Marvin Francois and Beauford White entered the home of a small-time drug dealer, then tied up and shot eight people, six of whom died. Francois and Beauford would be executed in the electric chair, while Ferguson, who had raised the insanity defense for 36 years would be executed by lethal injection in 2013.
- Born: Jonathan Rhys Meyers (stage name for Jonathan O'Keeffe), Irish film and TV actor, 2006 Golden Globe Award winner known for portraying Elvis Presley in the 2006 TV miniseries Elvis; in Dublin

== July 28, 1977 (Thursday) ==
- Armed robbers in France committed what the newspaper France-Soir dubbed "the heaviest holdup in the world" after stopping a truck that was on its way from the French mint at Pessac to the Bank of France in Paris. The cargo was 17 million French francs, equivalent to US$3,540,000, but all of it was freshly-minted coins — 1-franc, 5-franc and 10-franc pieces. The French newspaper L'Aurore called the crime the robbery of "The Piggy Bank Truck" and asked the robbers in print, "Please write and tell us how on earth you are going to get rid of it. You can't buy a chateau, a car or even a pair of crocodile shoes with bags of change." In November, police arrested a man and a woman at their residence in Avon, Seine-et-Marne and found $270,000 worth of the missing coins
- Peru's military ruler, President Francisco Morales Bermudez pledged in a nationally-televised address that general elections would be held in 1980 in order for Peru to make a transition to civilian government.
- Zulfiqar Ali Bhutto was released from a prison where he had been held in "protective custody" for more than three weeks after his July 5 overthrow as Prime Minister of Pakistan. Bhutto said upon being freed, "You will see as time passes that, no matter how the dice are loaded against me, the people are with me." Bhutto would be re-arrested on September 3 and charged with the murder of a political opponent, a crime for which he would later be convicted and executed.
- Born: Manu Ginóbili, Argentine professional basketball player known for championship wins in the NBA, the EuroLeague and the Olympics; in Bahía Blanca

== July 29, 1977 (Friday) ==
- The first oil from the Trans-Alaska Pipeline arrived in Valdez, Alaska, at 1:02 in the morning, 50 days after the Alyeska Pipeline Service opened the pipeline on June 20 at Prudhoe Bay.
- The Judge Retirement Age act took effect in Australia upon receiving royal assent and required that any federal judges appointed afterward would be put on retirement at age 70. Ray Northrop would be the last of the Australian federal judges exempt from mandatory retirement, and would step down in 1998 at the age of 73.

== July 30, 1977 (Saturday) ==
- Left-wing German terrorists Susanne Albrecht, Brigitte Mohnhaupt and Christian Klar assassinated Jürgen Ponto, chairman of the Dresdner Bank at Oberursel in West Germany.
- Born: Jaime Pressly, American TV actress and Emmy Award winner for My Name Is Earl; in Kinston, North Carolina
- Died: Jean de Laborde, 98, former French Navy admiral during World War II who was convicted of treason for the 1942 scuttling of the French fleet at Toulon

== July 31, 1977 (Sunday) ==
- The "Southern Tagalog 10", 10 students at the University of the Philippines Los Baños were kidnapped after their activism against the martial law rule of Philippine dictator Ferdinand Marcos. The bodies of three of the victims (Virgilio Silva, Salvador Panganiban, and Modesto Sison) would be found later. The other seven (including group leader Gerry Faustino, Jessica Sales, Rizalina Ilagan and Cristina Catalla) were never seen again.
- The Son of Sam serial killer in New York City claimed his final victims, shooting Robert Violante and Stacy Moskowitz while they sat in a car parked in the Bensonhurst section of Brooklyn.
- Died: Giuseppe Castellano, 83, Italian Army general who negotiated the surrender of Italy to the Allies in 1943
