= June 1977 =

Month of 1977

<<	June 1977					>>
Su	Mo	Tu	We	Th	Fr	Sa
			1	2	3	4
5	6	7	8	9	10	11
12	13	14	15	16	17	18
19	20	21	22	23	24	25
26	27	28	29	30

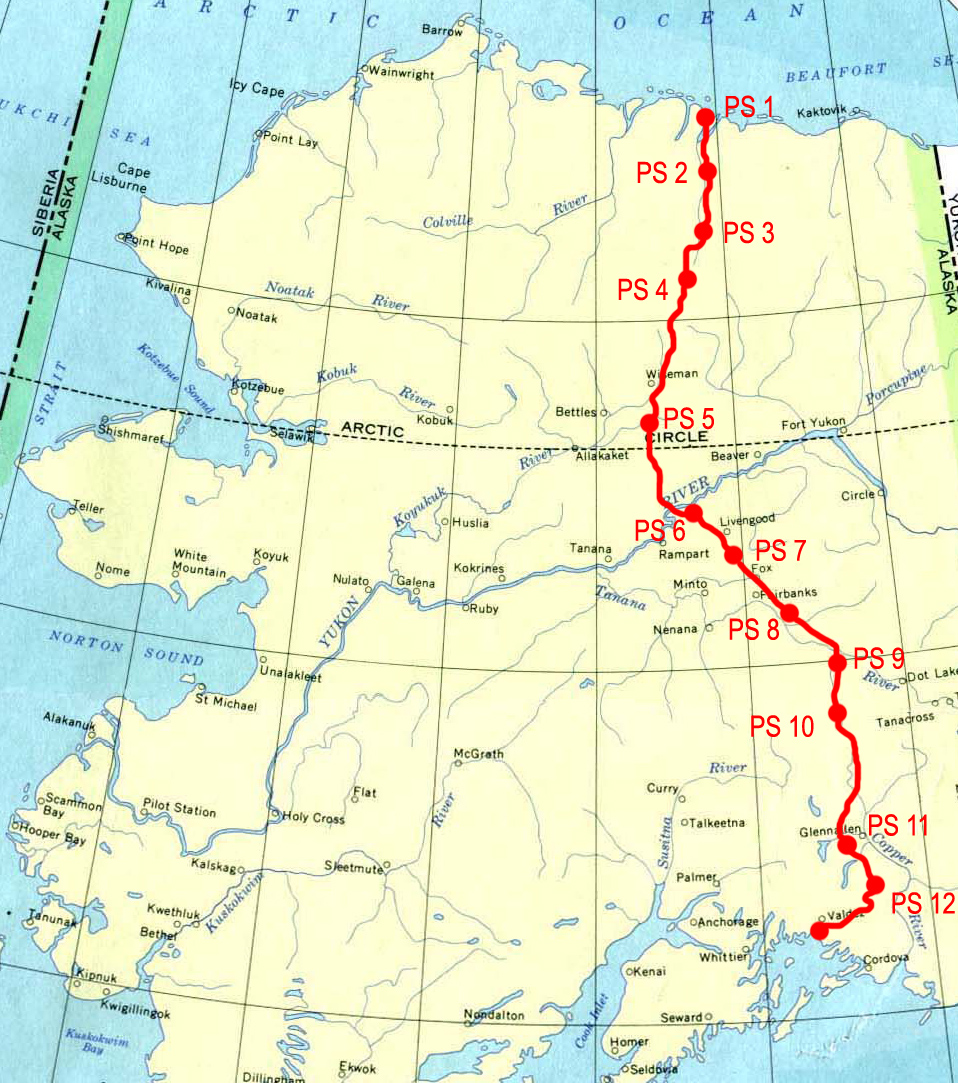
June 20, 1977: Trans-Alaska Pipeline begins operations in the U.S.

The following events occurred in June 1977:

== June 1, 1977 (Wednesday) ==
- The Arabic language daily newspaper "Al-Arab", published in London, was introduced by entrepreneur Ahmed el-Houni, who had formerly been the minister of information for Libya.
- The Japanese playing card company Nintendo put its first home video game on the market, branded as "Color TV-Game"
- Nintendo, founded in 1889 as a manufacturer of playing cards and which introduced a line of electronic toys in 1969, debuted its first home video game console, the Color TV-Game (カラー テレビゲーム or Karā Terebi-Gēmu). On June 8, a week after Color TV-Game 6 was released, Nintendo released Color TV-Game 15.
- Queen Juliana of the Netherlands asked Prime Minister Joop den Uyl to form a new coalition government with his Labor Party joining with the Christian Democrat leader, Andreas van Agt.
- Born: Sarah Wayne Callies, American TV actress known for The Walking Dead; in La Grange, Illinois
- Died: John Morris, 64, British historian

== June 2, 1977 (Thursday) ==
- The U.S. state of New Jersey became only the second in the United States (after Nevada) to legalize casino gambling, as Governor Brendan Byrne signed the Casino Control Act into law. The first casino, in Atlantic City's Resorts Casino Hotel, would open on May 26, 1978.
- Operation Aztec, Rhodesia's five-day invasion of neighboring Mozambique to stop attacks from the Zimbabwe African National Liberation Army (ZANLA) and the Frente de Libertação de Moçambique (FRELIMO), ended with the destruction of the section of the Limpopo railway that had carried guerrillas in Mozambique to the Rhodesian border, and the deaths of at least 60 ZANLA and FRELIMO combatants.
- In the Philippines, Allied Banking Corporation, which would become one of the largest banks in the nation, opened its first branch.
- Belgium's prime minister Leo Tindemans announced that he had formed a new government. He resigned three hours later after a dispute between French speaking and Flemish speaking members of his party.
- Born: Zachary Quinto, American TV and film actor known for portraying Sylar on the series Heroes and for Spock in the rebooted 2009 Star Trek film and its sequels; in Pittsburgh
- Died:
  - Stephen Boyd (stage name for William Millar), 45, Northern Irish film actor, Golden Globe winner for best supporting actor for his role in Ben Hur, died of a heart attack in the U.S. while playing golf in Northridge, California.
  - Fred Young (stage name for Njo Tiong Gie), 76, Indonesian film director

== June 3, 1977 (Friday) ==
- Elections were held in Morocco for 176 of the 264 seats of the Majlis, the lower house of Moroccan Parliament. The other 88 were indirectly elected, with 48 by local government councils, and 40 others from professional colleges. A total of 1,022 candidates ran for office; independent candidates won 81 seats (as well as 60 picked indirectly), while the Istiqlal Party won 46 and the Constitutional and Democratic Popular Movement (CDPM) won 29.
- The United States and Cuba announced that they would begin diplomatic relations for the first time since 1961, with the exchange of diplomats. The Cuban government followed by releasing 10 Americans who had been incarcerated in Cuban jails.
- Kasu Brahmananda Reddy, former Indian Minister of Home Affairs for Prime Minister Indira Gandhi, was elected as the new president of the Indian National Congress, in the wake of the political party's defeat in the March 20 elections.
- The United Kingdom deported former American CIA official Philip Agee, who had revealed the names of CIA agents, barring him from re-entry to the country after he had traveled to the Netherlands.
- Died:
  - Archibald Hill, 90, English biochemist and 1922 Nobel Prize laureate, known for the Hill equation
  - Roberto Rossellini, 71, Italian film director

== June 4, 1977 (Saturday) ==
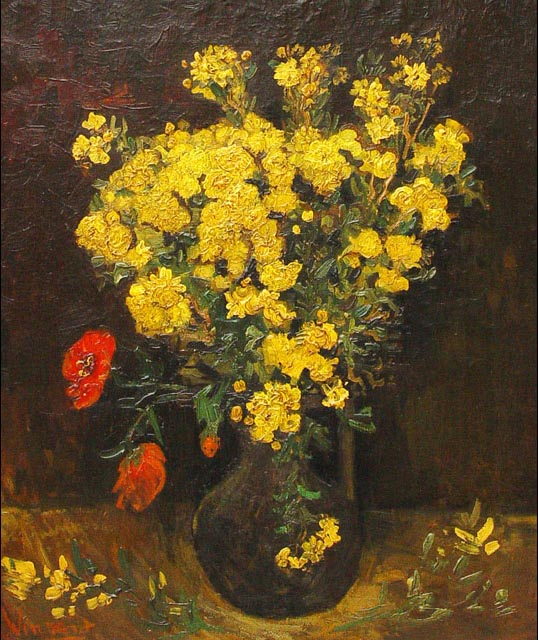
Poppy Flowers

- Vincent van Gogh's painting Poppy Flowers (Stilleven met viscaria), worth an estimated U.S.$55,000,000, was stolen from Cairo's Khalil Museum in Egypt. Recovered 10 years later, the painting would be stolen again in 2010 and has not been seen since then.
- A court in Cyprus dismissed murder charges against the two members of the terrorist group, EOKA-B, Ioannis Ktimatias and Nepotolemos Leftis. The two had been indicted for the 1974 assassination of U.S. Ambassador Rodger Davies and a Greek Cypriot secretary to the ambassador, Antoinette Varnavas. Ktimatias and Leftis were found guilty of the lesser offense of illegal use of firearms and rioting, with Ktimatias getting a seven-year sentence and Leftis five years.
- Marvin Mandel, Governor of the U.S. state of Maryland, stepped aside and appointed Lieutenant Governor Blair Lee III as ""Acting Chief Executive", after Mandel was indicted along with five co-defendants of the crimes of mail fraud and racketeering. After being convicted, Mandel would be sentenced to the federal prison at Eglin Air Force Base in Florida. Mandel would rescind Lee's powers on January 15, 1979, after his conviction was overturned on appeal, and serve the remaining two days of his elected term.
- Died: František Michl, 75, Czech artist who had been incarcerated by the Nazi German government for being anti-fascist, and by the Czechoslovak government for being anti-Communist.

== June 5, 1977 (Sunday) ==
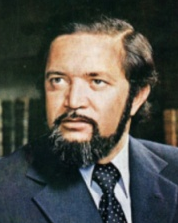
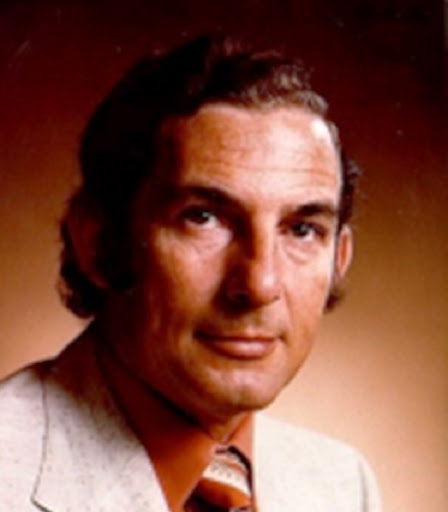
Mancham and René
- A bloodless coup overthrew the government of President James Mancham while he was out of the country, and installed France-Albert René as President of the Seychelles. Mancham was in the UK at the time, attending the British Commonwealth meeting.
- Elections were held in Turkey for all 450 seats of the unicameral Grand National Assembly of Turkey, referred to in Turkey as the Meclis. With 226 seats needed for a majority, the Republican People's Party (Cumhuriyet Halk Partisi or CHP) of former Prime Minister Bülent Ecevit increased its strength from 185 to 213 seats, while the right-wing "Nationalist Front" coalition of Premier Süleyman Demirel was forced out of office.
- The Portland Trail Blazers beat the Philadelphia 76ers, 109 to 107, to win the championship of the National Basketball Association, taking Game 6 of the best-4-of-7 series in Portland. With four seconds to play, George McGinnis of the 76ers missed a jump shot that would have sent the game into overtime.

== June 6, 1977 (Monday) ==
- A week of celebrations of the Silver Jubilee of Elizabeth II began with the Queen lighting the fuse to a 30 feet (9.1 m) high bonfire in a ceremony before a crowd of 300,000 at Windsor Great Park. The lighting began the first of a network of 103 bonfires, lit consecutively across the island.
- Singer Elvis Presley released his last recording, "Way Down", which would reach number one on the Billboard Country Music chart on the week before he died, and #31 on the Billboard Hot 100 ten days before his August 16 death.
- The U.S. and the Republic of Congo agreed to resume diplomatic relations, 12 years after they had closed their embassies. the announcement came from Congo's Foreign Minister, Theophile Obenga, and U.S. Undersecretary of State William E. Schaufele Jr.
- Born:
  - Inam Karimov, Chief Justice of the Supreme Court of Azerbaijan since 2023; in Baku, Azerbaijan SSR, Soviet Union
  - Julius Amedume, Ghana-born British film director and producer; in Volta Region, Ghana
- Died: George Landen Dann, 76, Australian playwright

== June 7, 1977 (Tuesday) ==
- After a campaign by singer Anita Bryant, voters in a referendum in Miami-Dade County, Florida repealed ordinance 77-4 of the Dade County Commission that had outlawed discrimination on the basis of sexual orientation in employment, housing and public services. The ordinance had been passed on January 18. Bryant was able to persuade almost 70% of voters that protection of gay rights would be a threat to the community as part of her "Save the Children campaign, with 202,319 for repeal and 89,562 against it.
- In a special election to fill the unexpired term for Mayor of Chicago, interim Mayor Michael A. Bilandic defeated Republican challenger Dennis H. Block. Daley, elected to a sixth term in 1975, to expire on April 16, 1979, won 77.3 percent of the vote. He did not seek re-election.
- Elections were held for one-third of the members of the Turkish Senate, with 50 of the 150 seats to be filled.
- Convicted kidnapper Ted Bundy, on trial in Colorado for the 1975 murder of Caryn Campbell, escaped from the Pitkin County Courthouse in Aspen, Colorado. He would be recaptured three days later, but would escape from another Colorado jail on December 30.
- Born: Donovan Ricketts, Jamaican footballer with 100 appearances as goalkeeper for the Jamaica national team; in Montego Bay

== June 8, 1977 (Wednesday) ==
- Plans for a conversion of U.S. roadway signs to the metric system were canceled. Director William M. Cox of the Federal Highway Administration informed Iowa Congressman Charles E. Grassley that regulations published on April 27 for public notice and comment had received enough negative comment and protest to merit withdrawing the proposal. Cox explained later that "More than 5,000 comments were received, and about 98% of them were negative."
- The Sri Venkateswara Temple, the first Hindu temple to be built in the United States, was inaugurated in Penn Hills, Pennsylvania, a suburb of Pittsburgh.
- The daily Spanish newspaper for a Basque audience published its first issue. The paper, published by Editorial Iparraguirre, had some articles written in the Basque language as well. It would celebrate its 45th anniversary in 2022.
- Former U.S. President Gerald R. Ford hit a hole-in-one while playing golf, the year after losing the 1976 presidential election. Ford, who was participating in the pro-am Danny Thomas Memphis Golf Classic for charity, was only the second American president to accomplish the feat. The other one was Richard M. Nixon, who hit a hole-in-one on September 4, 1961, one year after losing the 1960 presidential election.
- Born: Kanye West, American rap artist and record producer; in Atlanta
- Died: Nathan H. Knorr, 72, Jehovah's Witness administrator as president of the Watch Tower Bible and Tract Society since 1942. He would be succeeded on June 22 by Frederick W. Franz.

== June 9, 1977 (Thursday) ==
- Taha Carim, the Turkish ambassador to Vatican City and envoy to the Roman Catholic Church, was shot to death by two Armenian Turks in retaliation for the Armenian genocide carried out by the Ottoman Empire from 1915 to 1917.
- A fire killed 42 people in a nightclub in Abidjan in the African nation of Côte d'Ivoire. An estimated 250 people had been in Le Pacha when the fire broke out. Most of the dead were foreign tourists from Europe and from Lebanon.
- The Silver Jubilee Walkway, a 15 miles (24 km) long footpath that allows walkers to see many of London's major tourist attractions (including Trafalgar Square, the Houses of Parliament, Westminster Abbey, St Paul's Cathedral, and the Tower of London) was opened to the public. The site would be renamed the Jubilee Walkway in 2002 on the occasion of the Queen's 50th anniversary of accession to the throne.
- Born:
  - Sohail Abbas, Pakistani field hockey star with 311 caps for the Pakistan men's national field hockey team between 1998 and 2012; in Karachi
  - Peja Stojaković, Serbian-born professional basketball player, 2002-2004 NBA All-Star, 2011 MVP for EuroBasket; in Požega, SR Croatia, Yugoslavia

== June 10, 1977 (Friday) ==
- James Earl Ray, convicted assassin of Martin Luther King Jr., escaped from the Brushy Mountain State Penitentiary in Petros, Tennessee, where he was in the ninth year of a 99-year prison sentence. He and the other escapees would be recaptured on June 13. Ray then had his sentence extended by three years, from 2068 to 2071. He would die in 1998, 30 years and 19 days after Dr. King's murder.
- The first Apple II computers went on sale.

== June 11, 1977 (Saturday) ==
- In the Netherlands, the BBE, the Dutch special forces team, rescued all but two of 51 train passengers who had been taken hostage by nine South Moluccan terrorists on May 23, and the remaining four hostages at the Bovensmilde elementary school. At 5:00 in the morning, six F-104 Starfighter jets of the Royal Netherlands Air Force flew at low altitude over the train, using the deafening noise to disorient the terrorists, after which the BBE commandos fired rifles and machine guns at the areas on the train where the hijackers were known to be staying. Six hijackers and two hostages were killed.
- U.S. thoroughbred horse Seattle Slew won the American Triple Crown of horse racing by finishing four lengths ahead of the runner-up at the Belmont Stakes, after having won the Kentucky Derby and the Preakness Stakes.
- Born:
  - Geoff Ogilvy, Australian golfer, winner of the 2006 U.S. Open; in Adelaide, South Australia
  - Kim Hee-sun, South Korean TV actress; in Daegu

== June 12, 1977 (Sunday) ==
- The first Victoria's Secret women's lingerie store was opened by its founding couple, Roy Raymond and his wife Gaye Redmond, opening at the Stanford Shopping Center in Palo Alto, California. From an $80,000 investment, the Raymonds' business would earn $500,000 in its first year and expand with a mail order catalog and additional stores in San Francisco in 1978. In 1982, the Raymonds would sell the chain to Leslie Wexner for one million dollars.
- The musical Pippin closed on Broadway at the Imperial Theatre, where it had premiered on October 23, 1972, after 1,944 performances.
- Iustin Moisescu was selected as the new Patriarch of the Romanian Orthodox Church, elected by his peers as the Archbishop of Bucharest. He was formally installed on June 19 at the Romanian Patriarchal Cathedral in Bucharest, succeeding the Patriarch Justinian, who had died on March 26, 1977.
- Hisako Higuchi became the first Asian-born player to win a major golf title, winning the LPGA Championship at North Myrtle Beach, South Carolina.
- Born: Lil Duval (stage name for Roland Powell), African-American comedian and TV personality; in Jacksonville, Florida

== June 13, 1977 (Monday) ==
- A cylcone killed 105 people in the monarchy of Oman as it swept over Masirah Island and delivered sustained winds of up to 104 miles per hour (167 km/h), with gusts as high as 140 miles per hour (230 km/h). The storm wrecked 95% of the buildings on the island and left 2,000 people homeless.
- Three Girl Scouts, aged 8, 9, and 10, were murdered while camping at Camp Scott, located in Mayes County, Oklahoma. Gene Leroy Hart, who had escaped from prison, was arrested, but would be acquitted on March 30, 1979. Returned to prison to serve out his sentence, he would die of a heart attack three months later on June 4.
- Cleanup began of the Enewetak Atoll (in the U.S. Marshall Islands territory) after years of American nuclear weapons testing on the South Pacific group of 40 islands. A group of 222 troops from the U.S. Army's 84th Engineers Battalion was landed on the island of Lojwa, along with earth-moving equipment and concrete mix.
- Died:
  - Tom C. Clark, 77, former Associate Justice of the U.S. Supreme Court, 1949–1967, and U.S. Attorney General, 1945—1949
  - Matthew Garber, 21, English child actor known for having portrayed Michael Banks in the 1964 film Mary Poppins died of pancreatitis after having contracted hepatitis.

== June 14, 1977 (Tuesday) ==
- Arnold Miller defeated two other candidates, Lee Roy Patterson and Harry Patrick, to win re-election to a second five-year term as president of the United Mine Workers of America (UMWA) labor union, which had 277,000 members at the time.
- Died:
  - Alan Reed (stage name for Herbert Bergman), 69, American actor whose most famous role was as the voice of Fred Flintstone "Alan Reed Dies; Radio Straight Man, Voice of Fred Flintstone", Indianapolis Star, June 16, 1977, p. 92
  - Alex Phillips, 76, stage name for Alexander Pelepiock, Canadian-born Mexican cinematographer
  - Aleko Lilius, 87, Russian-born Swedish journalist and adventurer known for his 1931 book I Sailed with Chinese Pirates

== June 15, 1977 (Wednesday) ==
- The Kingdom of Spain held its first democratic elections since 1936, as it continued its transition to democracy from the rule of Francisco Franco. Voting was for all 350 seats in the Congress of Deputies and all 207 seats in the Senate of Spain, with 14 political unions competing. The Unión de Centro Democrático (UCD) coalition of 15 parties, led by incumbent Prime Minister Adolfo Suárez, won 165 seats in the Congress and a majority (106 of 207 seats) in the Spanish Senate.

== June 16, 1977 (Thursday) ==
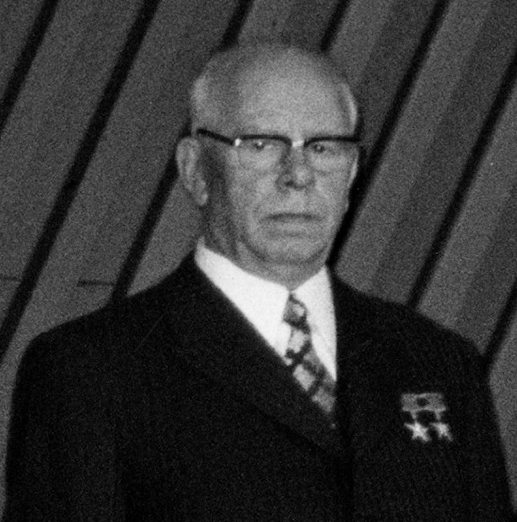
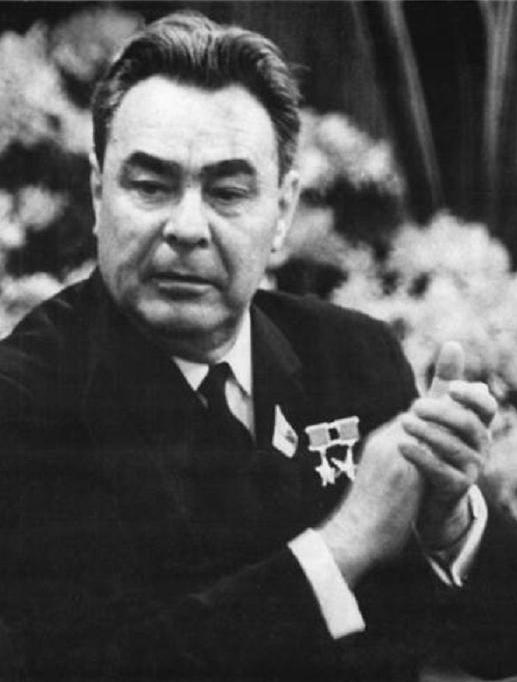
Podgorny replaced by Brezhnev
- Nikolai Podgorny was removed from his job as the nominal head of state of the Soviet Union. He was replaced as President of the Presidium of the Supreme Soviet by the de facto leader of the USSR, Communist Party General Secretary Leonid Brezhnev, who had held the office from 1960 to 1964 prior to becoming the leader of the Party. Having served as President of the Presidium of the Supreme Soviet of the USSR since 1965, and at one time part of the troika of CPSU General Secretary Leonid Brezhnev, Premier Alexei Kosygin and himself. He had been removed from the Communist Party Politburo three weeks earlier. A motion that Podgorny be "retired on pension" was approved without debate by the 1,517 deputies of the two houses of the Presidium, without Podgorny present and without a word of praise for his 11 years of service.
- Elections were held in the Republic of Ireland for all 148 seats of Dáil Éireann. Prior to the vote, the ruling Fine Gael party of Taoiseach Liam Cosgrave and the Labour Party, led by Brendan Corish had a coalition government of 75 seats for a majority. The Fianna Fáil party of former Taoiseach Jack Lynch had 69. The coalition parties lost 13 seats, while Lynch's party gained 15 for 84 seats and majority control to form a new government.
- The U.S. launched its second geosynchronous weather satellite, GOES 2 (Geostationary Operational Environmental Satellite), placed initially over the 75th meridian west to observe weather in the eastern United States, supplementing GOES 1, which had been placed in 1975 over the Indian Ocean.
- The Soviet Union launched Kosmos 917, its early warning satellite as part of its "Oko" network for missile detection, replacing the recently failed Kosmos 862 supplementing Kosmos 903.
- Shih Ming-teh, who had been a political prisoner in Taiwan since 1962 after being convicted of attempting to overthrow the government as part of the Formosa Independence Movement, was released by the Taiwanese government. Initially sentenced to life in prison, Shih had his sentence commuted to 15 years in 1975, and was set free 15 years after he had been jailed.
- The U.S. Department of Defense sent a message to U.S. Armed Forces commanders all around the world, "reminding them not to speak out of line or contradict Administration policy" of President Jimmy Carter. The warning went out after U.S. Army Lieutenant General Donn A. Starry had told a high school graduating class at the base in Frankfurt, West Germany, that the Soviet Union and China would likely fight a major war and that the United States would probably get involved.
- Died:
  - Wernher von Braun, 65, German and American rocket scientist who was a leader in the development of the V-2 rocket for Nazi Germany, and later of the missiles and rockets for the U.S. space program, died of pancreatic cancer.
  - Benjamin W. Lee, 42, Korean-born U.S. theoretical physicist who had correctly predicted the mass of the charm quark, was killed in an automobile accident on Interstate 80 near Kewanee, Illinois, when a truck crossed the median and crashed into his vehicle.

== June 17, 1977 (Friday) ==
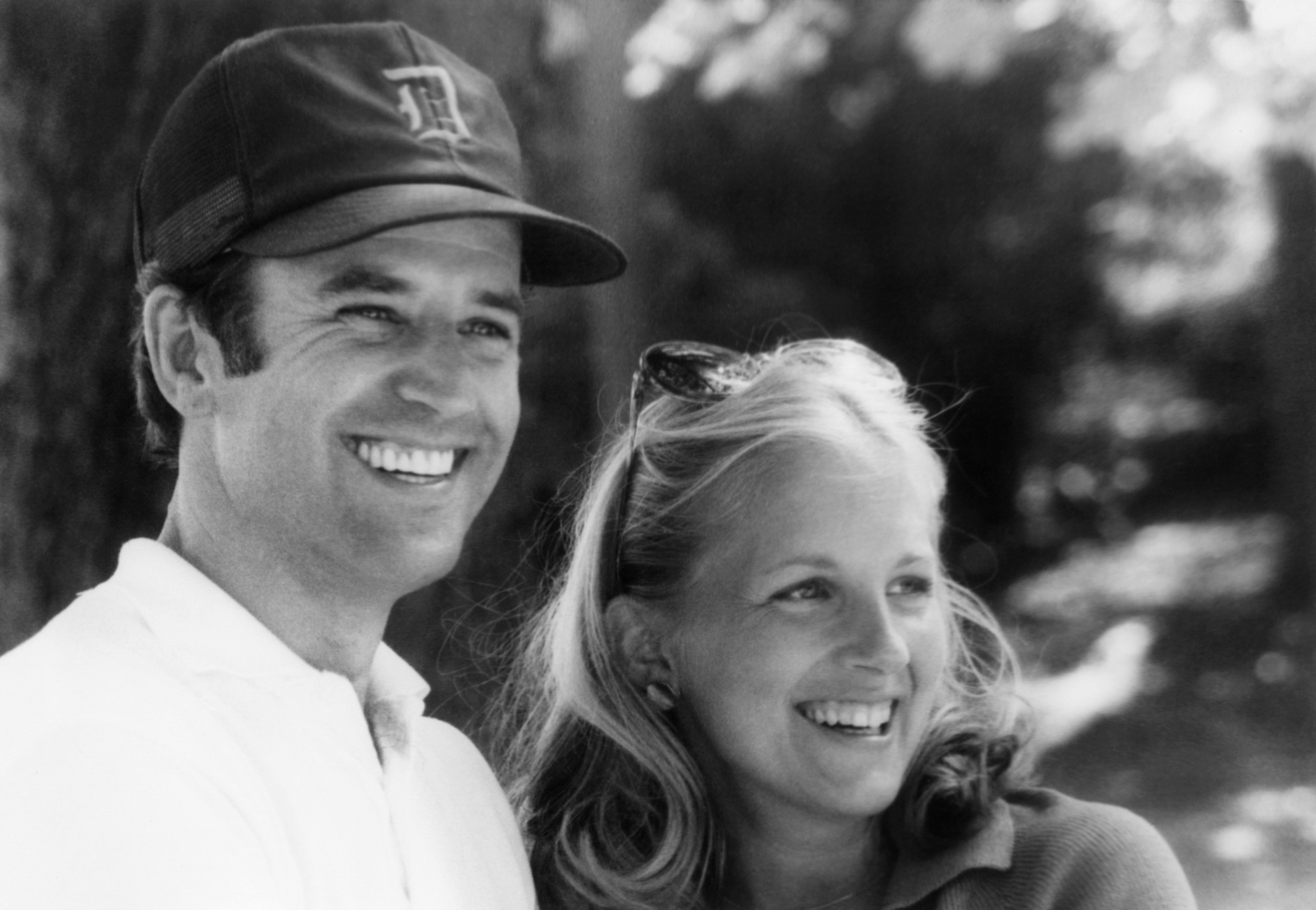
Joe Biden and his new wife Jill Jacobs

- High school teacher Jill Jacobs married U.S. Senator Joe Biden of Delaware at the Chapel at the United Nations in New York City. The wedding was the second for both, after Biden's first wife, Neilia Hunter Biden, had been killed in a car accident on December 18, 1972, and after Jacobs had divorced her first husband, Bill Stevenson, in 1975. In 2021, Mr. and Mrs. Biden would become the President and the First Lady of the United States.
- The Soviet Union conducted what a U.S. Department of Defense spokesman said was a successful test of a "killer satellite", as Kosmos 918 was launched against a specific target, Kosmos 909, which had been put into orbit on May 20. Although there was no actual destruction of 909, the DOD said that its own data "allows for a close approach and a probable successful mission occurred." After the fall of the USSR, archives showed that the test had failed and that 918 had been de-orbited; a first successful test would occur on October 26, 1977.
- The U.S. Supreme Court issuing its ruling in the case of Dobbert v. Florida ruled, 6 to 3, that a person convicted of murder could be legally executed even though the crime for which he received the death penalty took place under a law that was later found unconstitutional. Ernest John Dobbert had brutally murdered two of his children in 1971, but was not indicted until 1974. All U.S. death penalty laws enacted before 1972 had been declared unconstitutional in Furman v. Georgia. Dobbert, who was white, would die in the electric chair on September 7, 1984.

== June 18, 1977 (Saturday) ==
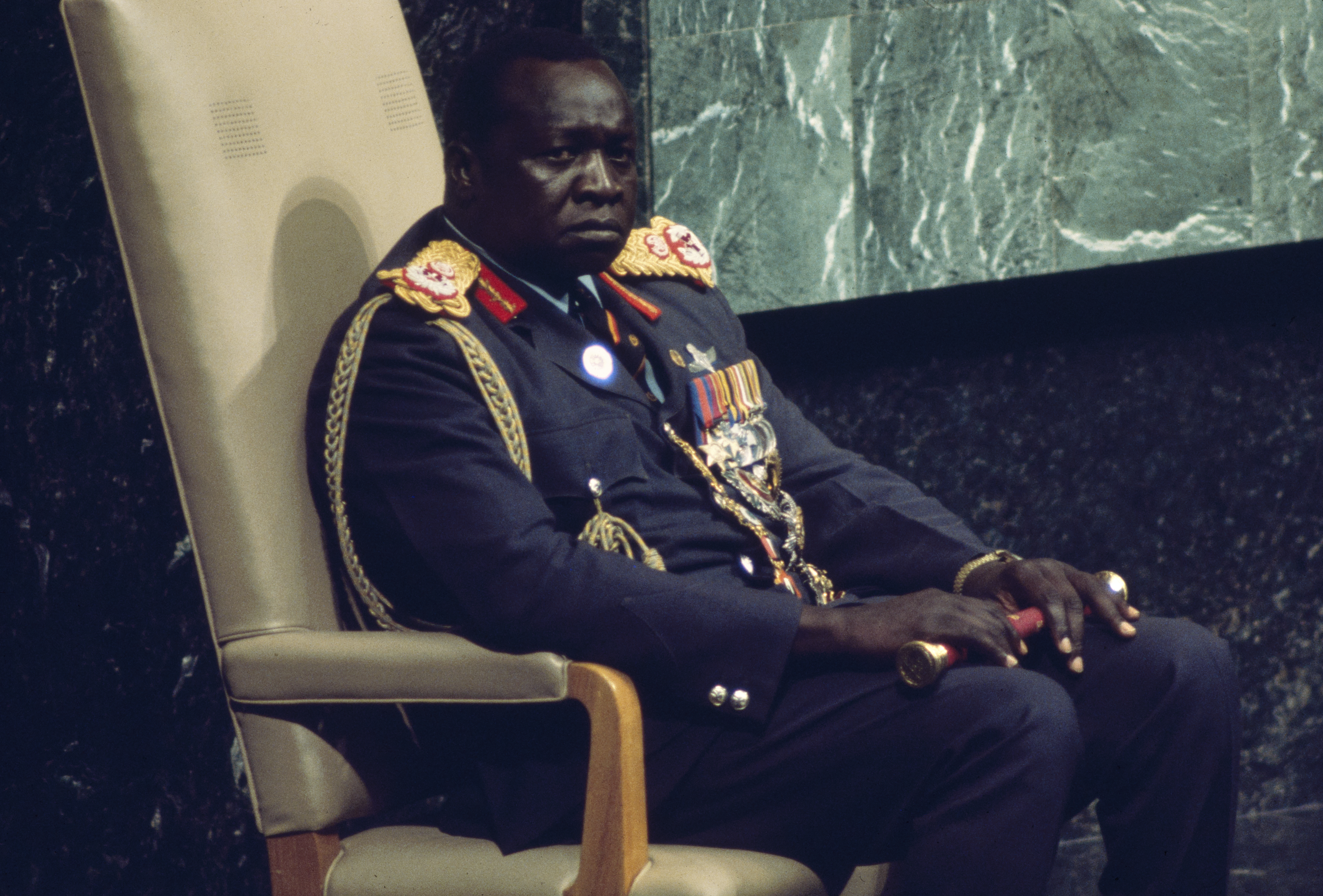
Idi Amin

- The "Uganda Liberation Movement" (ULM), a group of 500 dissidents led by Patrick Kimumwe from the Army of Uganda attempted Operation Mafuta Mingi, an assassination plot and coup d'état against the government of dictator Idi Amin Dada. The State Research Bureau, Uganda's internal security agency, was tipped off by an informant and President Amin changed his plans, riding with a convoy of cars from Entebbe to Kampala. Unexpectedly, Amin's convoy ran into the ULM's backup unit at Baitababiri. Not knowing which car of the presidential convoy was occupied by Amin, the ULM guerrillas attacked as many cars as they could, and actually shattered the windows of Amin's car (causing him minor injuries) before the guards in each car counterattacked. After the attempt, Amin carried out a purge of soldiers and a roundup of civilians from the Baganda and Busoga tribes. Kimumwe and five other plotters would escape from prison on September 23, before their scheduled execution, but would drown 15 months in 1978.
- American astronauts Fred W. Haise, Jr. and Gordon Fullerton made the first of flight of a crew in the Space Shuttle, although as one reporter noted, "the flying was all done while the spacecraft was riding piggyback atop the Boeing 747 transport." The airplane carrying the Space Shuttle Enterprise took off from and landed at Edwards Air Force Base in southern California.
- Born:
  - Kaja Kallas, Prime Minister of Estonia since 2021 and the first woman to serve as Estonian premier; in Tallinn
  - Majed Moqed, Saudi Arabian terrorist who assisted in the killing of 184 people in the September 11, 2001 attack on the Pentagon as one of five hijackers of American Airlines Flight 77; in Al-Nakhil (d. 2001)
- Died: Francois Geoffroy-Dechaume, French Ambassador to Burma (now Myanmar) was killed in a car accident.

== June 19, 1977 (Sunday) ==
- John Neumann, the German-born Roman Catholic Bishop of Philadelphia became the first (and thus far, only) American man to be canonized as a saint.
- The body of Uruguay's national hero, José Artigas, was re-interred at the newly opened Artigas Mausoleum in Montevideo at the Plaza Independencia.
- Voting was held for the 354 seats of the Great Khuralunicameral parliament of the Mongolian People's Republic. Under the Communist government at the time, the only legal political party was the Mongolian People's Revolutionary Party (MPRP) and the slate of candidates was 328 MPRP members and 26 non-members approved by the MPRP. The Mongolian press claimed that only one registered voter failed to turn out for the election, with 694,854 out of 694,855 casting ballots.
- U.S. golfer Hubert Green won the U.S. Open, played at Southern Hills Country Club in Tulsa, Oklahoma, finishing one stroke ahead of 1975 champion Lou Graham (278 to 279). Green kept his composure after being informed of a death threat made by an anonymous caller who said that three men were "on their way" to shoot Green when he reached the 15th hole.
- Born: Veronika Vařeková, Czech supermodel; in Olomouc, Czechoslovakia
- Died:
  - Erno Schwarz, 75, Hungarian-born U.S. soccer player who founded the New York Americans team and coached the U.S. national team from 1953 to 1955
  - Dragiša Kašiković, 44, Yugoslavian Bosnian writer and journalist was stabbed to death in the office of his Chicago-based newspaper, Sloboda (Liberty), by agents of the UDBA, the Communist nation's secret police. The perpetrators, never individually identified, also murdered his 9-year-old stepdaughter, Ivanka Milosevich, the only other witness to the killing.

== June 20, 1977 (Monday) ==
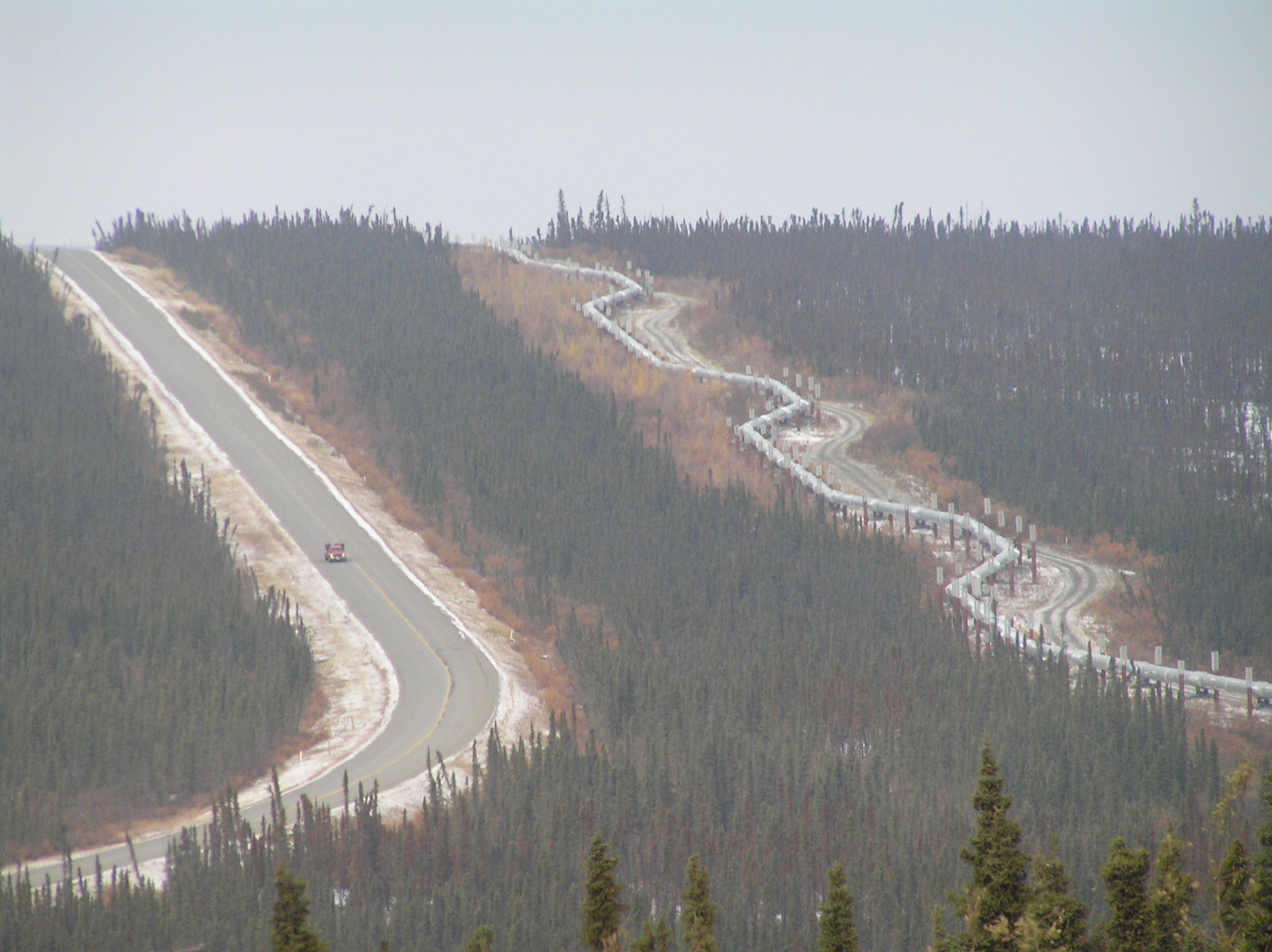
A section of the Pipeline

- The Alaska Pipeline (officially the Trans-Alaska Pipeline System) began operations as the first oil entered it from the North Slope oil fields at Prudhoe Bay in the U.S. state of Alaska. Fred Moore, a technician for the Alyeska Pipeline Service Company, pushed the button to open a 36 inches (910 mm) diameter valve to start the flow of oil at 10:00 in the morning (2000 UTC) Oil in the pipeline traveled southward along the 800 miles (1,300 km) at four miles per hour, until reaching the port of Valdez, Alaska, with the first petroleum arriving on August 1.
- Menahem Begin, whose Likud party won a plurality of seats in the May 17 elections was sworn in as the new Prime Minister of Israel after forming a coalition government that included some 3 members of the National Religious Party. Begin's cabinet was approved by a vote of 63 to 53 in the Knesset. Begin replaced Shimon Peres, who had served as Acting Prime Minister since April 22, after Yitzhak Rabin stepped aside because of a scandal.
- Died:
  - Rear Admiral Robert D. Workman, 92, Chief of Chaplains of the United States Navy from 1937 to 1945, who oversaw an increase in the number of Navy chaplains in World War II from less than 90 to more than 2,800.
  - Lea Joutseno, 66, Finnish film actress and comedian

== June 21, 1977 (Tuesday) ==
- Bülent Ecevit attempted to form a new coalition government for the Republic of Turkey, but failed to receive the vote of confidence.
- In Canada, a fire killed 21 inmates at the jail on the ground floor of the City Hall of Saint John, New Brunswick.
- The Republic of Chile released Jorge Montes, the General Secretary of the Chilean Communist Party, who had been imprisoned for almost four years since the overthrow of Salvador Allende's government in 1973. Montes was allowed to go to East Germany in return for the release of 11 political prisoners held by the East Germans. Chile's government-owned newspaper referred to Montes as the South American nation's "last political prisoner", notwithstanding thousands of people who had been imprisoned or disappeared after the coup.
- Former White House Chief of Staff H. R. Haldeman, who had been the top adviser to U.S. President Richard Nixon until forced to resign because of the Watergate scandal, began his prison sentence at the FCI Lompoc, the minimum security installation at Lompoc, California. He had been sentenced to eight years in prison after his conviction of charges of conspiracy, obstruction of justice and perjury. Haldeman had chosen to report early and without notice, in order to avoid an expected gathering of reporters for the Wednesday date.
- Born: Zayniddin Tadjiyev, Uzbek footballer with 18 caps for the Uzbekistan national team; in Tashkent, Uzbek SSR, Soviet Union

== June 22, 1977 (Wednesday) ==
- Former U.S. Attorney General John N. Mitchell reported to Federal Prison Camp, Montgomery, located on the grounds of Maxwell Air Force Base in Alabama. Mitchell was the 25th, and last person to be imprisoned in connection with Watergate, and the first former U.S. Attorney General to go to prison.
- The Rescuers, the Disney's 23rd animated feature film, premiered in theaters in the United States after a June 19 preview at the AFI Silver theater in Washington, D.C.. It featured the voices of Bob Newhart, Eva Gabor, the late Joe Flynn, Geraldine Page, Pat Buttram and Jeanette Nolan. Produced for $7.5 million, it grossed $48 million, six times as much, in its initial release.
- Died: Marston Morse, 85, American mathematician known for the Morse theory in differential topology, as well as the Morse–Palais lemma and the Thue–Morse sequence.

== June 23, 1977 (Thursday) ==
- In a 10-hour surgery at Children's Hospital in Washington, D.C., a 20-member surgical team (7 surgeons, 5 anesthesiologists and 8 nurses), led by Dr. Judson G. Randolph separated conjoined twins who had been born in April in Italy. The two girls were connected at a point from the sternum to the pelvis. Each child had a heart, a stomach and intestines, a pair of lungs, and a spine, but shared a pair of kidneys, a liver and a diaphragm. One of the twins would die on August 13 from an infection that arose from the surgery.
- The U.S. Navy launched the most sophisticated navigation satellite up to that time, NTS-2 (Navigational Technology Satellite 2), into orbit to replace the Navstar GPS satellite that failed shortly after its 1974 launch.
- Born:
  - Ben Grossman, American visual effects artist, winner of the 2011 Academy Award for Best Visual Effects for Hugo, and an Emmy Award for Special Visual Effects for The Triangle in 2006; in Washington, D.C.
  - Jason Mraz, American singer-songwriter known for the popular song "I'm Yours, winner of two Grammy Awards; in Mechanicsville, Virginia
  - Sian Heder, American film screenwriter and director, winner of the 2021 Academy Award for Best Adapted Screenplay for CODA; in Cambridge, Massachusetts

== June 24, 1977 (Friday) ==
- The National Primary Drinking Water Regulations, the first federal rules promulgated by the U.S. under the Safe Drinking Water Act, went into effect, setting limits for six synthetic organic chemicals, ten inorganic chemicals, five radionuclides, coliform bacteria, and turbidity, went into effect.
- Three days before the creation of the African Republic Djibouti from France, the colonial Chamber of Deputies unanimously elected Hassan Gouled as the nation's first president. On the same day, Aden Robleh Awaleh, leader of the Front de Libération de la Côte des Somalis guerrillas that had fought for independence, was seriously injured after being beaten in an assassination attempt. Though hospitalized, he would be named Djibouti's Minister of the Port three weeks later, and Minister of Commerce, Transport and Tourism the next year.
- Born: Mal Michael, Papua New Guinean Australian rules football fullback; in Port Moresby
- Died: André-Gilles Fortin, 33, Canadian politician who had been elected president of the Social Credit Party seven months earlier, was killed in an auto accident.

== June 25, 1977 (Saturday) ==
- The African nation of Ethiopia introduced its new "People's Militia" of 80,000 people, mostly peasants, who had undergone weeks of training by 30 advisers from Cuba. The militia's size made it the third-largest armed force in Africa, and was assembled in eight divisions, each with 100 groups of 100 soldiers, on the runway of the old airport at Addis Ababa.
- Australia defeated Great Britain, 13 to 12, to win the Rugby League World Cup in a match at the Sydney Cricket Ground before 24,450 spectators.
- Real Betis won Spain's Copa del Rey after winning a penalty-shootout over Athletic Bilbao in front of 70,000 people at the Vicente Calderón Stadium in Madrid. Betis had finished in fifth place in the 1976-77 La Liga regular season in Spain's premier soccer football league, La Liga, and Bilbao had finished third. Playing to a 2–2 draw after extra time, the two teams competed in a shootout which was unresolved until the 10th attempt by each team, with Betis hitting 8 kicks and Bilbao 7.
- U.S. park ranger Roy Sullivan, nicknamed "the Human Lightning Rod" for having been struck on multiple occasions by lightning, was hit by a bolt for the seventh and final time while at the Shenandoah National Park in Virginia, surviving the experience but suffering burns to his hair, chest and stomach. After being struck in 1942, he said he had been hit again in 1969, 1970, 1972, 1973, and 1976. Sullivan would commit suicide in 1983.
- Fanfreluche, a thoroughbred horse bred in Canada and the 1970 winner of the Sovereign Award for Horse of the Year, was kidnapped from her stall at the Claiborne Farm in Paris, Kentucky, while carrying the foal of Secretariat. She would be found six months later in Tennessee after her kidnappers abandoned her.
- U.S. musician Prince Rogers Nelson of Minneapolis signed his first recording contract, negotiated by his agent, Owen Husney. Under the three-album contract, Nelson, who would shorten his stage name to "Prince", was given creative control by the Warner Bros company.
- Born: Naoya Tsukahara, Japanese gymnast and Olympic gold medalist; in Nagasaki
- Died: Olave Baden-Powell, 88, widow of Scouting founder Robert Baden-Powell, known for building the Girl Guides and (in the U.S.) the Girl Scouts into a worldwide organization with chapters in over 100 nations by the time of her death.

== June 26, 1977 (Sunday) ==
- A fire at the county jail in Maury County, Tennessee killed six visitors and 36 inmates, who were unable to be released from their cells because each cell required a separate key. The fire occurred during visiting hours when a juvenile, held in a padded holding cell, set fire to the fabric. During the panic, keys to the cell were knocked out of a deputy's hands in a collision with a fleeing visitor, and 12 minutes passed before the key ring could be relocated, during which toxic gas and smoke was spread by the jail's ventilating system. On December 21, 1978, after spending 18 months imprisonment, Andrew Zimmer would be set free after pleading guilty to one count of arson and 42 counts of involuntary manslaughter, and receiving a suspended sentence and five years probation.
- At Market Square Arena in Indianapolis, Indiana, American singer Elvis Presley performed his last concert. Scheduled to start a second tour in August, Presley would die on August 16.
- Born: Tite Kubo, Japanese manga artist who created the manga series BLEACH; in Fuchū, Hiroshima Prefecture
- Died: Sergei Lemeshev, 74, Russian operatic lyric tenor

== June 27, 1977 (Monday) ==
Djibouti

- The territory of the Afars and Issas, the last European colony in Africa, became independent from France as the Republic of Djibouti, with Hassan Gouled Aptidon as its first President.
- A collision between a passenger train and a freight train in East Germany killed 29 people near Lebus, now in Germany's Brandenburg state. East Germany's Transport Minister, Otto Arndt (who also directed the state-owned railroad, the Deutsche Reichsbahn), said that the disaster had been caused by a switching error. The switchman was arrested the next day for negligence in putting the passenger express train on a collision course with the parked freight train.
- Born: Raúl (Raúl González Blanco) Spanish footballer with 102 caps as a forward for the Spain national team

== June 28, 1977 (Tuesday) ==
- The U.S. Supreme Court ruled in the case of Nixon v. Administrator of General Services Administration, 7 to 2, that former U.S. President Richard Nixon had no right to White House tape recordings and documents as private property, and upheld the 1974 Presidential Records and Materials Preservation Act.
- The Albert Einstein Society was founded at Bern in Switzerland by Dr. Max Flückiger to honor individual scientists who had contributed to furthering Einstein's work. The first Einstein Medal presented by the Society would be awarded to British astrophysicist and mathematician Stephen Hawking in 1979. The Society also restored Einstein's former home at Kramgasse 49 in Bern and would open it to the general on March 14, 1979, the centennial of Einstein's 1879 birth.

== June 29, 1977 (Wednesday) ==
- The African nations of Somalia and Kenya fought a one-day battle, as more than 3,000 Somali National Army soldiers invaded the Kenyan Army border post of Rhamu in an attempt to attack the Ethiopian Army. Supported by the Somali Air Force, the Somali Army killed 480 Kenyan soldiers and police officers, destroyed 20 tanks and captured or destroyed more than 40 armored vehicles. The Somalis lost 19 soldiers and five tanks.
- Defying the orders of Pope Paul VI, Roman Catholic Archbishop Marcel Lefebvre ordained 14 priests in the city of Econe in Switzerland. Despite his challenge to the Pope to excommunicate him, Lefebvre continued defying the Papacy and would not be excommunicated until 1986.
- Born:
  - Jeff Baena, American film director and screenwriter; in Miami
  - Keagborekuzi I, traditional monarch of the Agbor in Nigeria; as Benjamin Keagborekuzi Ikenchukwu in Agbor, Delta State, Federal Republic of Nigeria. Upon the death of his father, Obi Ikenchukwu I, on April 29, 1979, Keagborekuzi would be crowned King of Agbor at the age of 22 months.
- Died:
  - Sylvia Ashley (stage name for Edith Hawkes), 73, English actress and socialite known for her five marriages, including to Clark Gable (1942–1952) and Douglas Fairbanks Sr. (1936–1939)
  - Magda Lupescu, 77, former mistress of Romania's King Carol II as Princess Helena of Romania. In 1925, as his mistress, she led Crown Prince King Carol to abandon his rights to the throne in order for their marriage to take place, but the couple returned to power in 1937 in a coup d'état until his forced abdication in 1940.

== June 30, 1977 (Thursday) ==
- U.S. President Jimmy Carter ordered a halt to any further production of the controversial B-1 bomber, based on its unprecedented cost of 102 million dollars for each aircraft and the U.S. Air Force goal of 244 B-1s in its arsenal. Carter's successor, U.S. President Ronald Reagan, would revive the project and 100 B-1B bombers would be manufactured by Rockwell International between 1983 and 1988.
- Nine years after the Prague Spring, Czechoslovakia's Communist Party and government granted amnesty to almost all of its 75,000 citizens who had fled the country after the 1968 invasion by the Soviet Union and Warsaw Pact forces, dropping charges and in absentia convictions for having left the country illegally. The only dissidents denied amnesty were those who publicly criticized Czechoslovakia after their departure.
- Brazil's President Ernesto Geisel, who had been granted dictatorial powers, issued a decree removing his chief political opponent from office. Alencar Furtaco of the Chamber of Deputies, leader of the opposition to Geisel's military regime, was barred from office for 10 years by Geisel's order.
- With only 8 members left after the withdrawal of Pakistan and the conquest of South Vietnam, the Southeast Asia Treaty Organization (SEATO) was permanently disbanded.
- Born: Justo Villar, Paraguayan footballer and goalkeeper with 102 caps for the Paraguay national team; in Cerrito
