= History of magnetic resonance imaging =

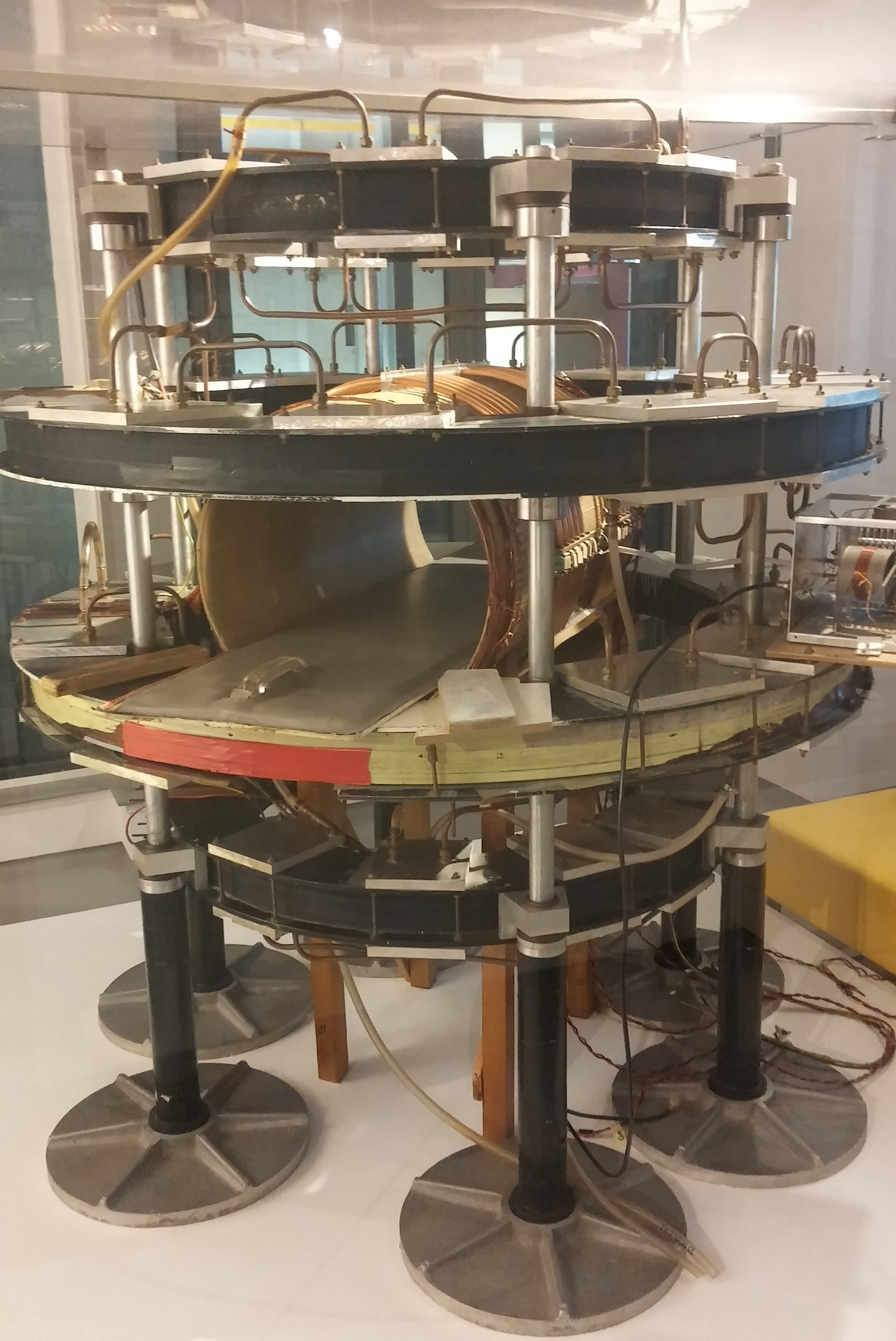
MRI Scanner Mark One. The first MRI scanner to be built and used, in Aberdeen Royal Infirmary in Scotland.

The history of magnetic resonance imaging (MRI) includes the work of many researchers who contributed to the discovery of nuclear magnetic resonance (NMR) and described the underlying physics of magnetic resonance imaging, starting early in the twentieth century. One researcher was American physicist Isidor Rabi who won the Nobel Prize in Physics in 1944 for his discovery of nuclear magnetic resonance, which is used in magnetic resonance imaging. MR imaging was invented by Paul Lauterbur who developed a mechanism to encode spatial information into an NMR signal using magnetic field gradients in September 1971; he published the theory behind it in March 1973.

The factors leading to image contrast (differences in tissue relaxation time values) had been described nearly 20 years earlier by physician and scientist Erik Odeblad and Gunnar Lindström. Among many other researchers in the late 1970s and 1980s, Peter Mansfield further refined the techniques used in MR image acquisition and processing, and in 2003 he and Lauterbur were awarded the Nobel Prize in Physiology or Medicine for their contributions to the development of MRI. The first clinical MRI scanners were installed in the early 1980s and significant development of the technology followed in the decades since, leading to its widespread use in medicine today.

== Nuclear magnetic resonance ==
Isidor Rabi won the Nobel Prize in Physics in 1944 for his discovery of nuclear magnetic resonance, which is used in magnetic resonance imaging. In 1950, spin echoes and free induction decay were first detected by Erwin Hahn and in 1952, Herman Carr produced a one-dimensional NMR spectrum as reported in his Harvard PhD thesis.

The next step (from spectra to imaging) was proposed by Vladislav Ivanov in Soviet Union, who filed in 1960 a patent application for a Magnetic Resonance Imaging device. Ivanov's main contribution was the idea of using magnetic field gradient, combined with a selective frequency excitation/readout, to encode the spatial coordinates. In modern terms, it was only proton-density (not relaxation times) imaging, which was also slow, since only one gradient direction was used at a time and the imaging had to be done slice-by-slice. Nevertheless, it was a true magnetic resonance imaging procedure. Originally rejected as "improbable", Ivanov's application was finally approved in 1984 (with the original priority date).

== Relaxation times and early development of MRI ==
By 1959, Jay Singer had studied blood flow by NMR relaxation time measurements of blood in living humans. Such measurements were not introduced into common medical practice until the mid-1980s, although a patent for a whole-body NMR machine to measure blood flow in the human body was filed by Alexander Ganssen in early 1967.

In the 1960s, the results of work on relaxation, diffusion, and chemical exchange of water in cells and tissues of various types appeared in the scientific literature. In 1967, Ligon reported the measurement of NMR relaxation of water in the arms of living human subjects. In 1968, Jackson and Langham published the first NMR signals from a living animal, an anesthetized rat.

In the 1970s, it was realized that the relaxation times are key determinants of contrast in MRI and can be used to detect and differentiate a range of pathologies. A number of research groups had shown that early cancer cells tended to exhibit longer relaxation times than their corresponding normal cells and as such stimulated initial interest in the idea of detecting cancer with NMR. These early groups include Damadian, Hazlewood and Chang and several others. This also initiated a program to catalog the relaxation times of a wide range of biological tissues, which became one of the main motivations for the development of MRI.

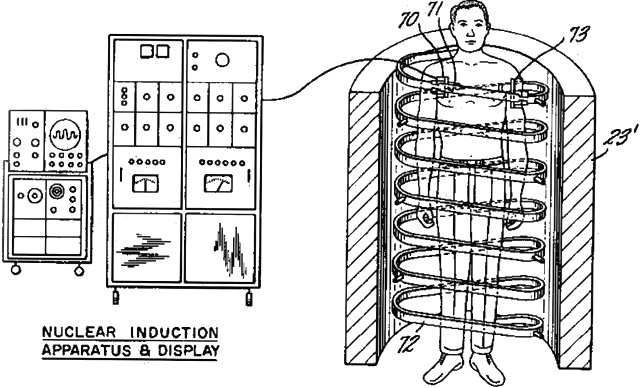
Raymond Damadian's "Apparatus and method for detecting cancer in tissue".

In a March 1971 paper in the journal Science, Raymond Damadian, an Armenian-American doctor and professor at the Downstate Medical Center State University of New York (SUNY), reported that tumors and normal tissue can be distinguished in vivo by NMR. Damadian's initial methods were flawed for practical use, relying on a point-by-point scan of the entire body and using relaxation rates, which turned out not to be an effective indicator of cancerous tissue. While researching the analytical properties of magnetic resonance, Damadian created a hypothetical magnetic resonance cancer-detecting machine in 1972. He patented such a machine, U.S. patent 3,789,832 on February 5, 1974. Lawrence Bennett and Dr. Irwin Weisman also found in 1972 that neoplasms display different relaxation times than corresponding normal tissue. Zenuemon Abe and his colleagues applied the patent for a targeted NMR scanner, U.S. patent 3,932,805 in 1973. They published this technique in 1974. Damadian claims to have invented the MRI.

The U.S. National Science Foundation notes "The patent included the idea of using NMR to 'scan' the human body to locate cancerous tissue." However, it did not describe a method for generating pictures from such a scan or precisely how such a scan might be done.

== Imaging ==
Paul Lauterbur at Stony Brook University expanded on Carr's technique and developed a way to generate the first MRI images, in 2D and 3D, using gradients. In 1973, Lauterbur published the first nuclear magnetic resonance image and the first cross-sectional image of a living mouse in January 1974. In the late 1970s, Peter Mansfield, a physicist and professor at the University of Nottingham, England, developed the echo-planar imaging (EPI) technique that would lead to scans taking seconds rather than hours and produce clearer images than Lauterbur had. Damadian, along with Larry Minkoff and Michael Goldsmith, obtained an image of a tumor in the thorax of a mouse in 1976. They also performed the first MRI body scan of a human being on July 3, 1977, studies they published in 1977. In 1979, Richard S. Likes filed a patent on k-space U.S. patent 4,307,343.

=== Full-body scanning ===
During the 1970s, a team led by John Mallard built the first full-body MRI scanner at the University of Aberdeen. On 28 August 1980, they used this machine to obtain the first clinically useful image of a patient's internal tissues using MRI, which identified a primary tumour in the patient's chest, an abnormal liver, and secondary cancer in his bones. This machine was later used at St Bartholomew's Hospital, in London, from 1983 to 1993. Mallard and his team are credited for technological advances that led to the widespread introduction of MRI.

In 1975, the University of California, San Francisco Radiology Department founded the Radiologic Imaging Laboratory (RIL). With the support of Pfizer, Diasonics, and later Toshiba America MRI, the lab developed new imaging technology and installed systems in the United States and worldwide. In 1981 RIL researchers, including Leon Kaufman and Lawrence Crooks, published Nuclear Magnetic Resonance Imaging in Medicine. In the 1980s the book was considered the definitive introductory textbook to the subject.

In 1980, Paul Bottomley joined the GE Research Center in Schenectady, New York. His team ordered the highest field-strength magnet then available, a 1.5 T system, and built the first high-field device, overcoming problems of coil design, RF penetration and signal-to-noise ratio to build the first whole-body MRI/MRS scanner. The results translated into the highly successful 1.5 T MRI product-line, delivering over 20,000 systems. In 1982, Bottomley performed the first localized MRS in the human heart and brain. After starting a collaboration on heart applications with Robert Weiss at Johns Hopkins, Bottomley returned to the university in 1994 as Russell Morgan Professor and director of the MR Research Division.

== Additional techniques ==
In 1986, Charles L. Dumoulin and Howard R. Hart at General Electric developed MR angiography and Denis Le Bihan, obtained the first images and later patented diffusion MRI. In 1988, Arno Villringer and colleagues demonstrated that susceptibility contrast agents may be employed in perfusion MRI. In 1990, Seiji Ogawa at AT&T Bell labs recognized that oxygen-depleted blood with dHb perturbed the magnetic field uniformity, leading to the discovery of the technique that underlies Functional Magnetic Resonance Imaging (fMRI) in experiments conducted in Minnesota in Kamil Ugurbil's laboratory and in Harvard/MGH by a group led by Kenneth Kwong.

In the early 1990s, Peter Basser and Le Bihan working at NIH, and Aaron Filler, Franklyn Howe and colleagues published the first DTI and tractographic brain images. The first DTI tractogram of the brain appears as figure 17 in US Patent 5,560,360 (filed 3/9/1993, published by the United States October 1, 1996) which also describes at column 20 the use of mixtures of strengths from three primary gradients to produce an infinite number of gradient directions (The nexus between Peter Basser and Aaron Filler appears to be that in 1979-1980 Basser was a senior at Harvard College and Filler taught a course at Harvard College that was required by Basser's BA program - where Filler lectured on brain tracts and tensors using a type of tensor math set forth in Tauxe et al J Geophys Res 1990 95:4391 - and this is the same math - sub-type of tensor analysis - both Filler and Basser used in the invention of DTI. Filler as well as the tensor math geologists Tauxe Badgley and Constable all worked with David Pilbeam, a past Dean of Harvard College). Joseph Hajnal, Young and Graeme Bydder described the use of FLAIR pulse sequence to demonstrate high signal regions in normal white matter in 1992. In the same year, arterial spin labelling was developed by John Detre and Alan P. Koretsky. In 1997, Jürgen R. Reichenbach, E. Mark Haacke and coworkers at Washington University School of Medicine developed Susceptibility weighted imaging.

Advances in semiconductor technology were crucial to the development of practical MRI, which requires a large amount of computational power.

MRI is most commonly performed in the clinic at 1.5 T, and 3 T for clinical imaging. In 1999, Kamil Ugurbil and colleagues at the Center for Magnetic Resonance Research (CMRR), University of Minnesota, introduced 7 Tesla for human imaging, primarily motivated by the gains expected for fMRI at 7 T. Adaptation by vendors followed and today 7 T is gaining popularity as at the most advanced instrument for clinical diagnosis in the brain and joints and for biomedical research because of the increased sensitivity and resolution. In research laboratories, human studies have been pushed to even higher magnetic fields like 9.4 T and 10.5 T (2019), in Ugurbil's group in Minnesota and 11.7T in France (2024). Non-human animal studies have been performed at up to 21.1 T.

In 2020, the United States Food and Drug Administration (USFDA) proffered 510(k) approval of Hyperfine Research's bedside MRI system. It uses a standard electrical outlet for power.

== 2003 Nobel Prize ==
Reflecting the fundamental importance and applicability of MRI in medicine, Paul Lauterbur of Stony Brook University and Sir Peter Mansfield of the University of Nottingham were awarded the 2003 Nobel Prize in Physiology or Medicine for their "discoveries concerning magnetic resonance imaging". The Nobel citation acknowledged Lauterbur's insight of using magnetic field gradients to determine spatial localization, a discovery that allowed the acquisition of 3D and 2D images. Mansfield was credited with introducing the mathematical formalism and developing techniques for efficient gradient utilization and fast imaging. The research that won the Prize was done almost 30 years earlier while Paul Lauterbur was a professor in the Department of Chemistry at Stony Brook University in New York.
