= Keagborekuzi I =

Dein of Agbor

Dein of Agbor
- In office: 2001 – present
- Coronation: 1979
- Born: 29 June 1977 (age 49); Agbor, Bendel State, Nigeria
Names
- English: Benjamin Keagborekuzi Ikenchukwu
- Father: Obi Ikenchukwu I
- Mother: Queen Victoria Ikenchukwu(née Egun)
- Religion: Christianity

Dein Keagborekuzi I (born Benjamin Keagborekuzi Ikenchuku Gbenoba on 29 June 1977) is the Dein of Agbor kingdom, a Nigerian traditional state in Delta State, Nigeria. He was named the world's youngest crowned monarch in the 1980 edition of the Guinness Book of World Records and he's the highest ranking Traditional Ruler in the whole of Delta State at both state and federal level and second highest ranking monarch in the entire south south region of Nigeria. He was the Chancellor of the University of Ilorin (2006–2015).

He was awarded Commander of the Order of the Niger, CON by President Muhammadu Buhari along with other 5 Ika Sons. He is known to be well read, and intellectually versatile.

== Early life, kingship education ==
Keagborekuzi I was born on 29 June 1977, in Agbor, Bendel State (now part of Delta State), Nigeria, to Obi Ikenchukwu I and Queen Grace Ikenchukwu (née Isedeh). His father's join his ancestors, on 29 April 1979. In 1979, after the unexpected demise of his father at age 22 months, he was crowned as the child king of the kingdom of Agbor. His name, Keagborekuzi means, "What is Agbor saying again?" The young crowned king was thereafter flown to United kingdom in 1981 and where for about the next twenty years of his life, he remained. To govern the kingdom, a regent reigned in his stead until 2001 when he returned to take over the governance of the monarchy. His 42nd birthday on Saturday 25 June 2019, was celebrated amidst pleasantries and praises from the Agbor people

In 2003, he helped resolve a dispute between two enemies, the Agbor-Obi Youth Movement and the police.

He was present with other monarchs of his home state who met in February 2020 to place a ban on herdsmen activities in their domains following attacks in the area by the herdsmen.

In March 2020, he told Daily Times Nigeria that his chiefdom would partner with the NAPTIP to end trafficking in persons in his domain.
