= Walter D. Knight =

American physicist known for the discovery of Knight shift

Walter D. Knight (October 14, 1919 – June 28, 2000) was an American physicist. He discovered the Knight shift, the effect that has been given his name. Knight shifts are frequency shifts of the nuclear magnetic resonance (NMR) in metals.

The Los Angeles Times said that Knight "pioneered the use of electric quadrupole resonance and magnetic resonance as sensitive probes in studying structural and other changes in metal crystals". The National Academies Press said that his "name has been immortalized in condensed-matter physics as the discoverer of a nuclear magnetic resonance phenomenon known as the Knight shift."

Knight was dean of the College of Letters and Science, UC Berkeley's largest college. He was also professor emeritus of physics at University of California, Berkeley, a member of the National Academy of Sciences, a member of the American Academy of Arts and Sciences, a fellow of the American Physical Society, and a fellow of the American Association for the Advancement of Science. Other distinctions included two honorary degrees: one from Middlebury College and the other from the Ecole Polytechnique Fédérale de Lausanne, and the Berkeley Citation, the highest honor of UC Berkeley.

== Life and career ==
Knight was born and grew up in New York City. He graduated from Middlebury College in Vermont in 1941. Knight received his M.A. and Ph.D. in physics from Duke University in North Carolina. He moved to the University of California, Berkeley in 1950 and progressed from assistant dean to associate dean to dean.
