= DGV =

DGV may refer to:

- DGV: Danse à Grande Vitesse, a 1973 ballet by Wheeldon
- Deutsche Gesellschaft für Vorgeschichte, a German society for archaeology and history
- Doppler global velocimetry, a method for measuring flow
