= Magritek =

Magritek is a scientific instrument company based in Wellington, New Zealand, and Aachen, Germany, that was established in 2004 and specialises in compact, portable and benchtop nuclear magnetic resonance (NMR) and magnetic resonance imaging (MRI) products. The technology was originally developed to enable NMR measurements in Antarctica by scientists at Massey and Victoria Universities in New Zealand, including Dr Robin Dykstra. This was combined with compact, handheld NMR magnet technology developed by researchers at RWTH University in Aachen.

Magritek is well known in New Zealand as an example of successful commercialisation of university developed IP and in 2010 the team behind the company won the Prime Minister's Science Prize led by famous New Zealand scientist Sir Paul Callaghan.

Magritek uses novel magnetic resonance techniques such as Earth's field NMR and Halbach array permanent magnets to create products such as the Spinsolve benchtop NMR spectrometer which enables both scientists and students to access high resolution NMR spectroscopy where they are working.

In 2009 they released a series of popular free videos explaining and demonstrating the principles of NMR and MRI.
