= Benchtop nuclear magnetic resonance spectrometer =

Spectrometer

A Benchtop nuclear magnetic resonance spectrometer (Benchtop NMR spectrometer) refers to a Fourier transform nuclear magnetic resonance (FT-NMR) spectrometer that is significantly more compact and portable than the conventional equivalents, such that it is portable and can reside on a laboratory benchtop. This convenience comes from using permanent magnets, which have a lower magnetic field and decreased sensitivity compared to the much larger and more expensive cryogen cooled superconducting NMR magnets. Instead of requiring dedicated infrastructure, rooms and extensive installations these benchtop instruments can be placed directly on the bench in a lab and moved as necessary (e.g., to the fumehood). These spectrometers offer improved workflow, even for novice users, as they are simpler and easy to use. They differ from relaxometers in that they can be used to measure high resolution NMR spectra and are not limited to the determination of relaxation or diffusion parameters (e.g., T1, T2 and D).

== Magnet development ==
The first generation of NMR spectrometers used large Electromagnets weighing hundreds of kilograms or more. Slightly smaller permanent magnet systems were developed in the 1960s-70s at proton resonance frequencies of 60 and 90 MHz and were widely used for chemical analysis using continuous wave methods, but these permanent magnets still weighed hundreds of kilograms and could not be placed on a benchtop. Superconducting magnets were developed to achieve stronger magnetic fields for higher resolution and increased sensitivity. However, these superconducting magnets are expensive, large, and require specialized building facilities. In addition, the cryogens needed for the superconductors are hazardous, and represent an ongoing maintenance cost. As a result, these instruments are usually installed in dedicated NMR rooms or facilities for use by multiple research groups.

Since the early 2000s there has been a renaissance in permanent-magnet technology and design, with advances sufficient to allow development of much smaller NMR instruments with useful resolution and sensitivity for education, research and industrial applications. Samarium–cobalt and neodymium hard ferromagnets have reduced the size of NMR permanent magnets, and fields up to 2.9 T have been reached, corresponding to a 125 MHz proton Larmor frequency. These designs, which operate with magnet temperatures from room temperature to 60 °C, allow instruments to be made small enough to fit on a lab bench, and are safe to operate in a typical lab environment. They require only single phase local power, and with UPS systems can be made portable and can perform NMR analyses at different points in a manufacturing area.

== Disadvantages of Small-Size Magnets and Methods to Overcome them ==
One of the biggest disadvantages of low-field (0.3-1.5T) NMR spectrometers is the temperature dependence of the permanent magnets used to produce the main magnetic field. For small magnets there was a concern that the intensity of external magnetic fields may adversely affect the main field, however the use of magnetic shielding materials inside the spectrometer eliminates this problem. The currently available spectrometers are easily moved from one location to another, including some that are mounted on portable trolleys with continuous power supplies. Another related difficulty is that currently available spectrometers do not support elevated sample temperatures which may be required for some in-situ measurements in chemical reactions.

A recent paper suggests that a special experimental setup, with two or more coils and synchronous oscillators, may help overcome this problem and allow it to work with unstable magnetic fields and with affordable oscillators.

NMR spectra acquired at low field suffer from less signal dispersion, which also leads to more complicated spectra with overlapping signals and higher order effects. The complete interpretation of such spectra requires computational quantum mechanical spectral analysis, for 1H-1D NMR spectra also known as HiFSA.

The weakness of permanent magnets' magnetic fields has been a major obstacle to the widespread adoption of benchtop nuclear magnetic resonance spectrometers, but this problem is being overcome by using bulk high-temperature superconductors.

Stacks of bulk high temperature superconducting (HTS) rings are promising candidates for the generation of the strong polarising fields required for nuclear magnetic resonance (NMR) when utilised as trapped field magnets (TFMs).Portable, low-cost magnetisation techniques such as pulsed field magnetisation (PFM) have been shown to readily trap fields up to 5 T within disc shaped samples.

== Applications ==
NMR spectroscopy can be used for chemical analysis, reaction monitoring, and quality assurance/quality control experiments. Higher-field instruments enable unparalleled resolution for structure determination, particularly for complex molecules. Cheaper, more robust, and more versatile medium and low field instruments have sufficient sensitivity and resolution for reaction monitoring and QA/QC analyses. As such permanent magnet technology offers the potential to extend the accessibility and availability of NMR to institutions that do not have access to super-conducting spectrometers (e.g., beginning undergraduates or small-businesses).

Many automated applications utilizing multivariate statistical analyses (chemometrics) approaches to derive structure-property and chemical and physical property correlations between 60 MHz 1H NMR spectra and primary analysis data particularly for petroleum and petrochemical process control applications have been developed over the past decade.

== Available Benchtop NMR Spectrometers ==
Development of this new class of spectrometers began in the mid-2000s leaving this one of the last molecular spectroscopy techniques to be made available for the benchtop.

=== Spinsolve ===
New Zealand- and Germany-based Magritek's Spinsolve instrument, operating at 90 MHz, 80 MHz, and 60 MHz, offers very good sensitivity and resolution less than 0.4 Hz and weighs 115 kg, 73 kg, and 60 kg respectively. The ULTRA model has an even higher resolution of 0.2 Hz with a lineshape of 0.2 Hz/ 6 Hz/ 12 Hz comparable to high field NMR specifications. 1H Proton, 19F Fluorine, 13C Carbon, 31P Phosphorus and other X-nuclei such as 7Li, 23Na, 29Si and others can be measured. Multiple X nuclei can be included on a single spectrometer, without sensitivity loss, using the Multi X option. A wide range of NMR spectra can be acquired including 1D, 1D with decoupling, solvent suppression, DEPT, T1, T2 and 2D HETCOR, HMBC, HMQC, COSY and JRES spectra. Pulsed field gradients for spectroscopy are included, and optional Diffusion pulsed field gradients can also be added. The magnet is stabilised with an external lock, which means it does not require the use of deuterated solvents. An online reaction monitoring accessory using a flow cell, and an autosampler are available. Samples are measured using standard 5 mm NMR tubes and the spectrometer is controlled through an external computer where standard NMR data collection and processing takes place.

=== picoSpin ===
In 2009, picoSpin LLC, based in Boulder, Colorado, launched the first benchtop NMR spectrometer with the picoSpin 45. A small (7 x 5.75 x 11.5”) 45 MHz spectrometer with good resolution (< 1.8 Hz) and mid-to-low-range sensitivity that weighs 4.76 kg (10.5 lbs) and can acquire a 1D 1H or 19F spectra. PicoSpin was acquired by Thermo Fisher Scientific in December 2012, and subsequently renamed the product Thermo Scientific picoSpin 45. Instead of the traditional static 5 mm NMR tubes, the picoSpin 45 spectrometer uses a flow-through system that requires sample injection into an 0.4 mm ID PTFE and quartz capillary. Deuterated solvents are optional due to the presence of a software lock. It needs only a web browser on any external computer or mobile device for control as the spectrometer has a built-in web server board; no installed software on a dedicated PC is required. In August 2013 a second version was introduced, the Thermo Scientific picoSpin 80, that operates at 82 MHz with a resolution of 1.2 Hz and ten times the sensitivity of the original picoSpin 45.

=== Nanalysis ===
Calgary, AB, Canada based Nanalysis Corp offers two benchtop NMR platforms: 60 and 100 MHz, which is 1.4 T and 2.35 T, respectively. The spectrometers are in an all-in-one enclosure (magnet, electronics and touchscreen computer) making them easier to site but all systems can be controlled locally or remotely by an external computer as preferred by the user. The 60 MHz is the smallest 60 MHz available on the market, weighing about 25 kg, and the 100 MHz, just under 100 kg.

Both platforms come in an ‘e’ model, which can acquire 1H/19F or in a ‘PRO’ model that observes 1H/19F/X (where X is defined by the customer but is most commonly 7Li, 11B, 13C, 31P). Depending on the model of instrument, it can perform 1D 1H, 13C{1H}, 19F, 31P, 31P{1H}, COSY, JRES, DEPT, APT, HSQC, HSQC-ME, HMBC, T1 and T2 experiments. The spectrometers use standard 5mm NMR tubes and are compatible with most third party NMR software suites.

Nanalysis acquired RS2D in 2020, expanding their magnetic resonance technology portfolio to include their superior cameleon4 technology, NMR consoles, preclinical MRI, and MR product lines. In 2021 Nanalysis also acquired the New York based software company, One Moon Scientific, to both offer routine, high-performance data processing and expand the analysis of NMR data including machine learning, database construction and search algorithms.

=== X-Pulse / Pulsar ===
In 2019, Oxford Instruments launched a new 60 MHz spectrometer called X-Pulse. This instrument is a significant improvement on the previous Pulsar system, launched in 2013. X-Pulse has the highest, as standard, resolution (<0.35 Hz / 10 Hz) of the currently available benchtop, cryogen-free NMR analysers. It incorporates a 60 MHz rare-earth permanent magnet. X-Pulse is the only benchtop NMR system to offer a full broadband X channel, allowing the measurement of 1H,19F, 13C, 31P, 7Li, 29Si, 11B and 23Na on a single probe. A large range of 1D and 2D measurements can be performed on all nuclei, 1D spectra, T1, T2, HETCOR, COSY, HSQC, HMBC, JRES, and many others including solvent suppression and selective excitation. X-Pulse also has options for flow NMR and a variable temperature probe allowing the measurement of samples in NMR tubes at temperatures from 20 °C to 60 °C. The magnet and spectrometer are in two separate boxes with the magnet weighing 149 kg and the electronics weighing 22 kg. X-Pulse requires a standard mains electrical supply and uses standard 5mm NMR tubes. Instrument control comes from the SpinFlow workflow package, while the processing and manipulation of data is achieved using third-party NMR software suites. Pulsar instruments were discontinued in 2019 following the launch of X-Pulse.

=== Bruker ===
In 2019, Bruker, a long time manufacturer and market leader of high performance NMR machines, introduced a Benchtop NMR, Fourier 80 FT-NMR. The machine uses permanent magnets, and operates using Bruker standard software (a full futured TopSpin 4 software for Windows and Linux; as well Python based API from Windows and Linux; and a simplified app called GoScan). Machine can be configured for 1H and 13C spectra (possibly more by a custom order) in 1D and 2D modes, and operates at 80 MHz (1.88 T). The machine weighs about 93 kg and consumes less than 300W when operating.

=== Q Magnetics ===
In late 2021, Q Magnetics introduced the QM-125, a 125 MHz (2.9 T) 1H benchtop NMR spectrometer with resolution better than 0.5 Hz. The instrument is contained in a single enclosure with a mass of 28 kg, and is connected to a controlling computer by a USB interface. The QM-125 spectrometer does not require the user to first transfer their sample to an NMR tube. It may be used in two ways: a walkup mode where a sample is drawn from a source with a syringe and then injected into the spectrometer; and an automated or hyphenated mode, where the sample is delivered to the RF coil by flow from another instrument. Other features that support automated and hyphenated applications are stable shim, open-source Python control software, and front-panel fluid connections. Power consumption of less than 50 W and relatively low cost support integration into vertical and dedicated applications.
