= PDV =

PDV, PdV or pdv may refer to:

== Political parties ==
- Party of Reason (Partei der Vernunft), a libertarian party in Germany
- Party of the Venetians (Partito dei Veneti), a Venetist-separatist coalition of parties active in Veneto, Italy
- Venezuelan Democratic Party (Partido Democrático Venezolano), a Venezuelan party active in the 1940s

== Science and technology ==
- Packet delay variation, the difference of delay of packets in computer networking
- Phocine distemper virus, a virus of the genus Morbillivirus that is pathogenic mainly to sea mammals
- Photon Doppler velocimetry, a technique for measuring the velocity in dynamic shock physics experiments
- Planar Doppler velocimetry, a technique for measuring the velocity of a flow based on a Doppler shift
- Polydnavirus, a member of the family Polydnaviridae of insect viruses

== Other uses ==
- Peter de Villiers (born 1957), South African rugby union coach and former head coach of the country's national team
- PDV, a part of the second phase of the Indian Ballistic Missile Defence Programme
- PDV Offset (post, digital, and visual effects offset), an Australian government incentive for the film industry
- Plovdiv Airport (IATA code PDV), airport in Bulgaria
- Present discounted value, in finance or economics, the value of an expected income stream determined as of the date of valuation
