= Spinlock SRL =

Argentine technology company

Spinlock
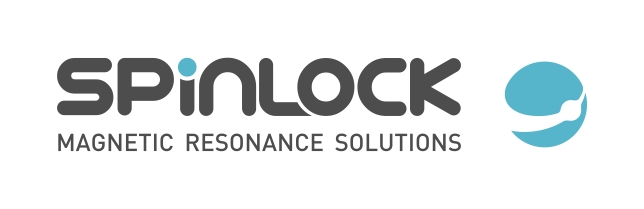
- Type: Private corporation
- Founded: 2003 in Argentina
- Founder: Dr. Daniel J. Pusiol
- Headquarters: Malagueño, Córdoba, Argentina
- Key people: Dr. Daniel J. Pusiol, President; Eng. Gabriela Albert, CEO; Eng. Amadeo Sasia CTO; ID. Bernardo Ballesté, COO
- Products: SLK 200, SLK GOW, MFM III, MRI 1400, PM SERIES
- Number of employees: 25
- Website: http://spinlock.com.ar/

Spinlock is a technology based company specialized in the manufacture and development of nuclear magnetic resonance (NMR) and nuclear quadrupole resonance (NQR) equipment.

== History ==
Spinlock was founded in 2003 by Dr. Daniel J. Pusiol, a renowned physicist specialized in NMR and NQR, professor at the National University of Córdoba and member of the National Scientific and Technical Research Council (CONICET) of Argentina.

Mr. Pusiol lead a team of young researchers to build Spinlock, manufacturing NMR spectrometers and providing Research and Development services for different industries, engaging on the discovery of new applications for the NMR technology.

Closely related to the National University of Córdoba, Spinlock contributes with the university on projects and receives continuous support in the form of education and consultation with leading scientists.

The organization employs scientist and technical staff from diverse areas: engineering, physics, chemistry and computer sciences.

Spinlock has shared its knowledge in international publications, forums and blogs (see Determinación del contenido de ácido oleico en semillas de maní por medio de la resonancia magnética nuclear (RMN)).

== Product lines ==
SLK - 100: (discontinued product) This Sigmometer use NMR spectroscopy to carry out a variety of analysis in food industry processes (e.g. moisture and fat content in food; oil and fatty acids in oily seeds and olives; solid and liquid fat ratio in cheese, chocolate and other dairy products).

SLK - 200: Desktop magnetic resonance equipment for measurement of oil or fat, moisture, fatty acid and protein content. Simultaneous, non-destructive and automated determination.

SLK-GOW Multiphase Water-Cut Meter: Resonance magnetic equipment for multiphase measurement Oil, water and gas. Deviates a multiphase sample to a secondary line (Bypass system). Water Cut Measurement (net oil and water), Gas Volume Fraction (GVF) and Oil Viscosity.

SLK-MFM-III Multiphase flow meter prototype equipment for magnetic resonance. Measures flow and cut of multiphase fluid, including water, gas and oil. Built for ø2´ lines with ø2´ Halbach magnet.

SLK-MRI-1400 Time domain magnetic resonance equipment (TD-NMR) suitable for imaging (MRI) with an ø 4´ circular Halbach magnet, with temperature control and compensation.

SLK-1000-PM Desktop magnetic resonance equipment for measurements of sidewall cores (core plugs) and other oil rock samples. Equipment for ambient pressure and temperature samples.

SLK-2000-PM Desktop magnetic resonance equipment for measurements of sidewall cores (core plugs) and other oil rock samples. Shale rock measurement capacity. It includes Z-gradient for diffusion experiments. Equipment suitable for high pressure and high temperature sample measurements
