= Knight shift =

The Knight shift is a shift in the nuclear magnetic resonance (NMR) frequency of a paramagnetic substance first published in 1949 by the UC Berkeley physicist Walter D. Knight.

For an ensemble of $N$ spins in a magnetic induction field $\vec{B}$, the nuclear Hamiltonian for the Knight shift is expressed in Cartesian form by:

${{\hat{\mathcal{H}}}_{\text{KS}}}=-\sum\limits_{\mathit{i}}^{{N}}{{{\gamma }_{\mathit{i}}}\cdot {{{\hat{\vec{I}}}}_{\mathit{i}}}\cdot {{{\hat{\mathbf{K}}}}_{\mathit{i}}}\cdot \vec{B}}$, where for the $i$^{th} spin ${\gamma }_{\mathit{i}}$ is the gyromagnetic ratio, ${{{\hat{\vec{I}}}}_{\mathit{i}}}$ is a vector of the Cartesian nuclear angular momentum operators, the
$${{{\hat{\mathbf{K}}}}_{i}}=\left( \begin{matrix}
{{K}_{xx}} & {{K}_{xy}} & {{K}_{xz}}  \\
{{K}_{yx}} & {{K}_{yy}} & {{K}_{yz}}  \\
{{K}_{zx}} & {{K}_{zy}} & {{K}_{zz}}  \\
\end{matrix} \right)$$
matrix is a second-rank tensor similar to the chemical shift shielding tensor.

The Knight shift refers to the relative shift K in NMR frequency for atoms in a metal (e.g. sodium) compared with the same atoms in a nonmetallic environment (e.g. sodium chloride). The observed shift reflects the local magnetic field produced at the sodium nucleus by the magnetization of the conduction electrons. The average local field in sodium augments the applied resonance field by approximately one part per 1000. In nonmetallic sodium chloride the local field is negligible in comparison.

The Knight shift is due to the conduction electrons in metals. They introduce an "extra" effective field at the nuclear site, due to the spin orientations of the conduction electrons in the presence of an external field. This is responsible for the shift observed in nuclear magnetic resonance. The shift comes from two sources, one is the Pauli paramagnetic spin susceptibility, the other is the s-component wavefunctions at the nucleus.

Depending on the electronic structure, the Knight shift may be temperature dependent. However, in metals which normally have a broad featureless electronic density of states, Knight shifts are temperature independent.
