= Earth's field NMR =

NMR use in the geomagnetic field

Nuclear magnetic resonance (NMR) in the geomagnetic field is conventionally referred to as Earth's field NMR (EFNMR). EFNMR is a special case of low field NMR.

When a sample is placed in a constant magnetic field and stimulated (perturbed) by a time-varying (e.g., pulsed or alternating) magnetic field, NMR active nuclei resonate at characteristic frequencies. Examples of such NMR active nuclei are the isotopes carbon-13 and hydrogen-1 (which in NMR is conventionally known as proton NMR). The resonant frequency of each isotope is directly proportional to the strength of the applied magnetic field, and the magnetogyric or gyromagnetic ratio of that isotope. The signal strength is proportional to the stimulating magnetic field and the number of nuclei of that isotope in the sample. Thus, in the 21 tesla magnetic field that may be found in high-resolution laboratory NMR spectrometers, protons resonate at 900 MHz. However, in the Earth's magnetic field the same nuclei resonate at audio frequencies of around 2 kHz and generate feeble signals.

EFNMR signals can be affected by magnetically noisy laboratory environments and natural variations in the Earth's field, which originally compromised its usefulness. However, this disadvantage has been overcome by the introduction of electronic equipment which compensates changes in ambient magnetic fields.

Whereas chemical shifts are important in NMR, they are insignificant in the Earth's field. The absence of chemical shifts causes features such as spin–spin multiplets (separated by high fields) to be superimposed in EFNMR. Instead, EFNMR spectra are dominated by spin–spin coupling (J-coupling) effects. Software optimised for analysing these spectra can provide useful information about the structure of the molecules in the sample.

== Applications ==
Applications of EFNMR include:

- Proton precession magnetometers (PPM) or proton magnetometers, which produce magnetic resonance in a known sample in the magnetic field to be measured, measure the sample's resonant frequency, then calculate and display the field strength.
- EFNMR spectrometers, which use the principle of NMR spectroscopy to analyse molecular structures in a variety of applications, from investigating the structure of ice crystals in polar ice-fields, to rocks and hydrocarbons on-site.
- Earth's field MRI scanners, which use the principle of magnetic resonance imaging.

The advantages of the Earth's field instruments over conventional (high field strength) instruments include the portability of the equipment giving the ability to analyse substances on-site, and their lower cost. The much lower geomagnetic field strength, that would otherwise result in poor signal-to-noise ratios, is compensated by homogeneity of the Earth's field giving the ability to use much larger samples. Their relatively low cost and simplicity make them good educational tools.

Although those commercial EFNMR spectrometers and MRI instruments aimed at universities are too costly for most hobbyists (one simple instrument is $9400 as of March 2025), internet search engines find data and designs for basic proton precession magnetometers which claim to be within the capability of reasonably competent electronic hobbyists or undergraduate students to build from readily available components costing no more than a few tens of US dollars. Two open source designs are available with PCB layouts and firmware for megaAVR microcontrollers, as well as a circuit layout and design in a peer reviewed journal.

An optical earth field spectrometer has also been described.

== Mode of operation ==
Free induction decay (FID) is the magnetic resonance due to Larmor precession that results from the stimulation of nuclei by means of either a pulsed dc magnetic field or a pulsed resonant frequency (rf) magnetic field, somewhat analogous respectively to the effects of plucking or bowing a stringed instrument. Whereas a pulsed rf field is usual in conventional (high field) NMR spectrometers, the pulsed dc polarising field method of stimulating FID is usual in EFNMR spectrometers and PPMs.

EFNMR equipment typically incorporates several coils, for stimulating the samples and for sensing the resulting NMR signals. Signal levels are very low, and specialised electronic amplifiers are required to amplify the EFNMR signals to usable levels. The stronger the polarising magnetic field, the stronger the EFNMR signals and the better the signal-to-noise ratios. The main trade-offs are performance versus portability and cost.

Since the FID resonant frequencies of NMR active nuclei are directly proportional to the magnetic field affecting those nuclei, we can use widely available NMR spectroscopy data to analyse suitable substances in the Earth's magnetic field.

An important feature of EFNMR compared with high-field NMR is that some aspects of molecular structure can be observed more clearly at low fields and low frequencies, whereas other features observable at high fields may not be observable at low fields. This is because:

- Electron-mediated heteronuclear J-couplings (spin–spin couplings) are field independent, producing clusters of two or more frequencies separated by several Hz, which are more easily observed in a fundamental resonance of about 2 kHz. "Indeed it appears that enhanced resolution is possible due to the long spin relaxation times and high field homogeneity which prevail in EFNMR."
- Chemical shifts of several parts per million (ppm) are clearly separated in high field NMR spectra, but have separations of only a few millihertz at proton EFNMR frequencies, and so are undetectable in an experiment that takes place on a timescale of tenths of a second.

For more context and explanation of NMR principles, please refer to the main articles on NMR and NMR spectroscopy. For more detail see proton NMR and carbon-13 NMR.

== Proton EFNMR frequencies ==
The geomagnetic field strength and hence precession frequency varies with location and time.

Larmor precession frequency = magnetogyric ratio x magnetic field
Proton magnetogyric ratio = 42.576 Hz/μT (also written 42.576 MHz/T or 0.042576 Hz/nT)
Earth's magnetic field: 30 μT near the equator to 60 μT near poles, around 50 μT at mid-latitudes.

Thus proton (hydrogen nucleus) EFNMR frequencies are audio frequencies of about 1.3 kHz near the Equator to 2.5 kHz near the Poles, around 2 kHz being typical of mid-latitudes. In terms of the electromagnetic spectrum EFNMR frequencies are in the VLF and ULF radio frequency bands, and the audio-magnetotelluric (AMT) frequencies of geophysics.

Examples of molecules containing hydrogen nuclei useful in proton EFNMR are water, hydrocarbons such as natural gas and petroleum, and carbohydrates such as occur in plants and animals.

== See also ==
- Rate of change of Earth's magnetic field
- Zero field NMR
