= Zero field NMR =

Acquisition of NMR spectra of chemicals

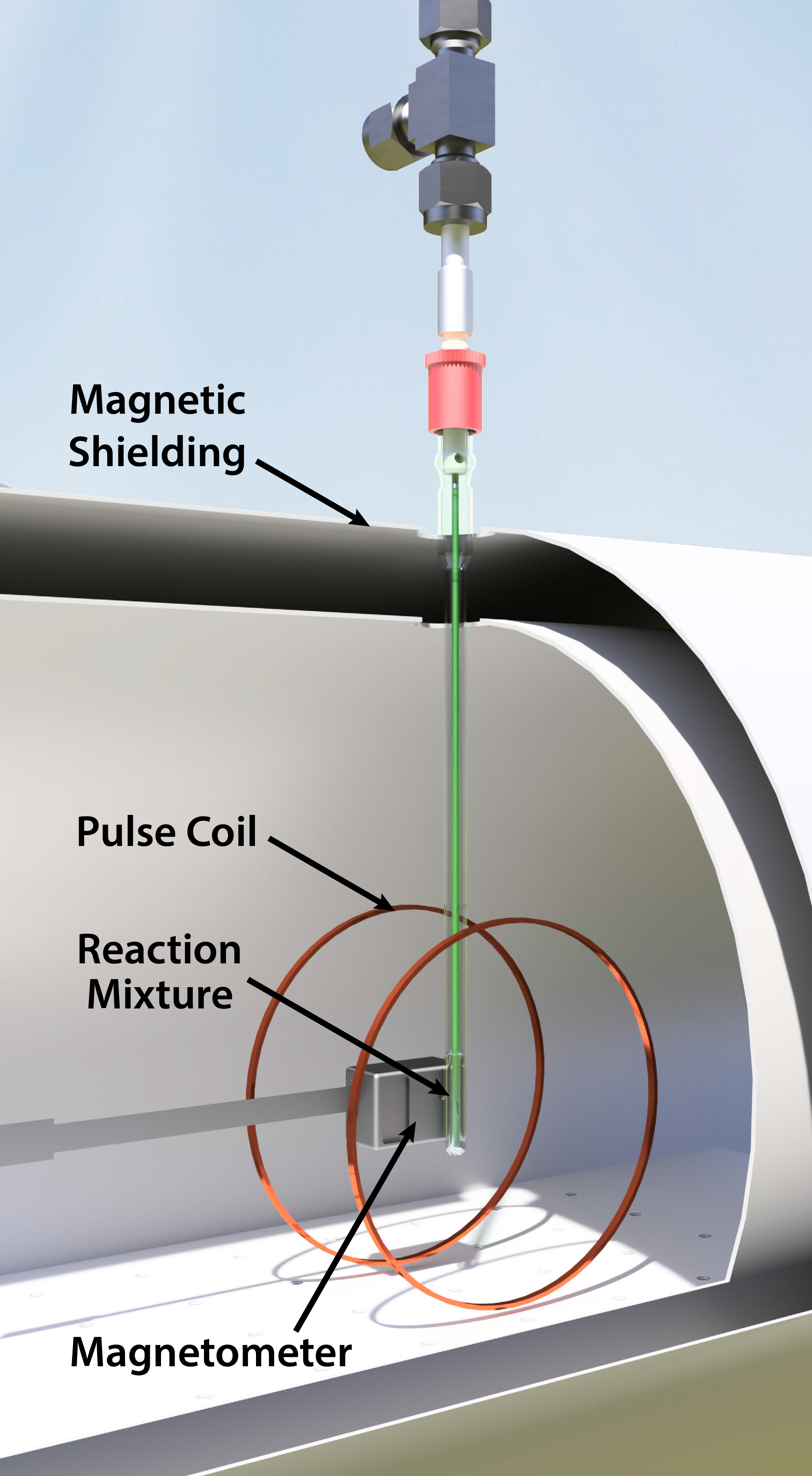
A sample being investigated using NMR spectroscopy in a zero-field NMR setup.

Zero- to ultralow-field (ZULF) NMR is the acquisition of nuclear magnetic resonance (NMR) spectra of chemicals with magnetically active nuclei (spins 1/2 and greater) in an environment carefully screened from magnetic fields (including from the Earth's field). ZULF NMR experiments typically involve the use of passive or active shielding to attenuate Earth's magnetic field. This is in contrast to the majority of NMR experiments which are performed in high magnetic fields provided by superconducting magnets. In ZULF experiments the sample is moved through a low field magnet into the "zero field" region where the dominant interactions are nuclear spin-spin couplings, and the coupling between spins and the external magnetic field is a perturbation to this. There are a number of advantages to operating in this regime: magnetic-susceptibility-induced line broadening is attenuated which reduces inhomogeneous broadening of the spectral lines for samples in heterogeneous environments. Another advantage is that the low frequency signals readily pass through conductive materials such as metals due to the increased skin depth; this is not the case for high-field NMR for which the sample containers are usually made of glass, quartz or ceramic. High-field NMR employs inductive detectors to pick up the radiofrequency signals, but this would be inefficient in ZULF NMR experiments since the signal frequencies are typically much lower (on the order of hertz to kilohertz). The development of highly sensitive magnetic sensors in the early 2000s including SQUIDs, magnetoresistive sensors, and SERF atomic magnetometers made it possible to detect NMR signals directly in the ZULF regime. Previous ZULF NMR experiments relied on indirect detection where the sample had to be shuttled from the shielded ZULF environment into a high magnetic field for detection with a conventional inductive pick-up coil. One successful implementation was using atomic magnetometers at zero magnetic field working with rubidium vapor cells to detect zero-field NMR.

Without a large magnetic field to induce nuclear spin polarization, the nuclear spins must be polarized externally using hyperpolarization techniques. This can be as simple as polarizing the spins in a magnetic field followed by shuttling to the ZULF region for signal acquisition, and alternative chemistry-based hyperpolarization techniques can also be used.

It is sometimes but inaccurately referred to as nuclear quadrupole resonance (NQR).

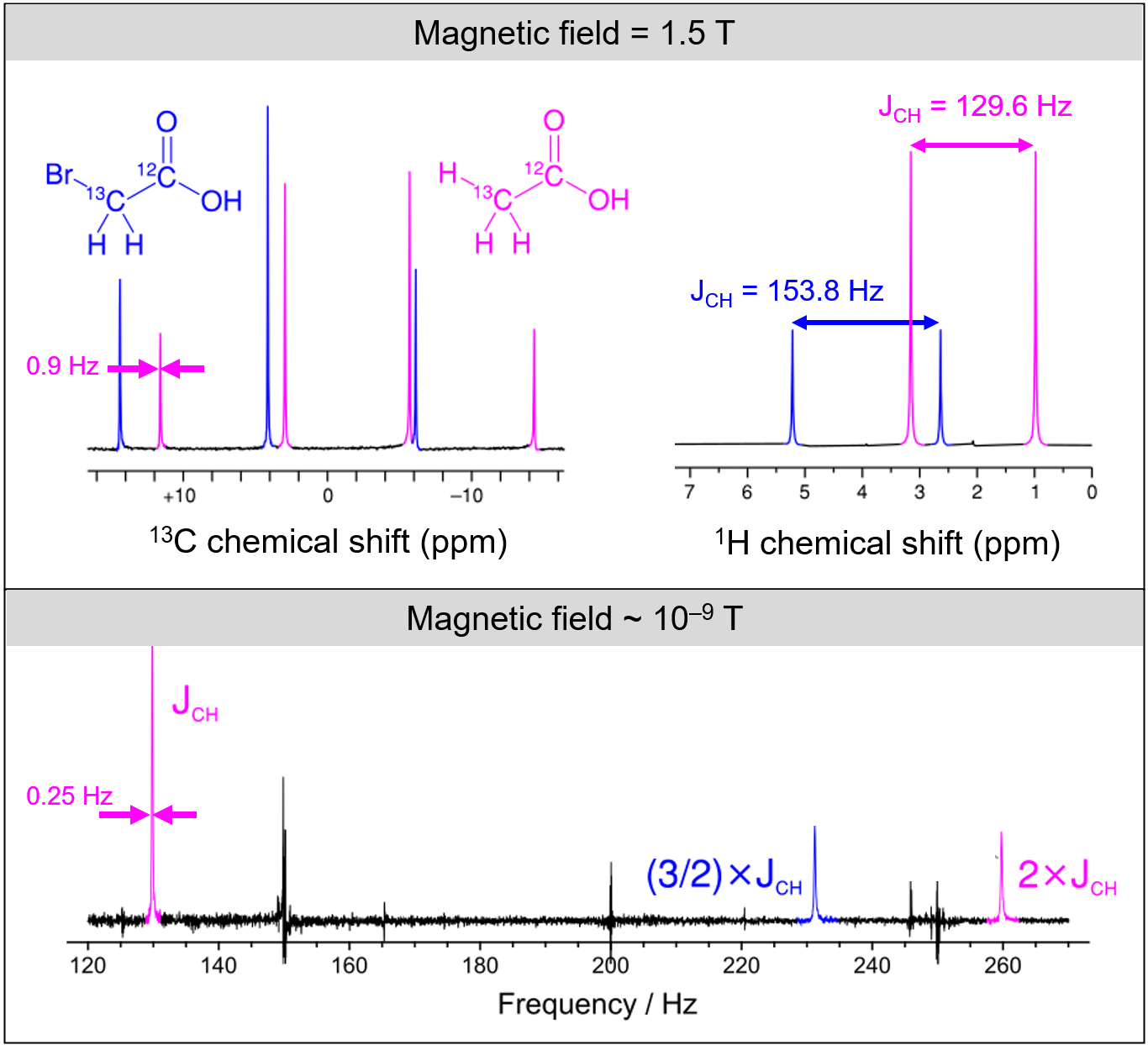
A comparison between high-field and zero-field NMR spectra of a sample containing a mixture of [2-^{13}C]-acetic acid and [2-^{13}C]-bromoacetic acid. In the high field, the ^{1}H and ^{13}C nuclear spin species precess at different frequencies, yielding distinct ^{1}H and ^{13}C spectra with the J-coupling perturbation splitting the resonance into doublet, triplet or quartet multiplet patterns. At zero field, there is no Larmor precession and the resonance frequencies are determined principally by the J-couplings. A notable feature is the narrow line width at zero field, owing to a lack of inhomogeneous broadening.

== Zero-field NMR experiments ==
=== Spin Hamiltonians ===
Free evolution of nuclear spins is governed by a Hamiltonian ($\hat{H}$), which in the case of liquid-state nuclear magnetic resonance may be split into two major terms. The first term ($\hat{H}_z$) corresponds to the Zeeman interaction between spins and the external magnetic field, which includes chemical shift ($\sigma$). The second term ($\hat{H}_J$) corresponds to the indirect spin-spin, or J-coupling, interaction.

$\hat{H}=\hat{H}_z+\hat{H}_J$, where:

$\hat{H}_z=-\hbar\sum_a\gamma_a(1-\sigma_a)\hat{I}_a\cdot B_0$, and

$\hat{H}_J=-\hbar 2\pi\sum_{a>b} J_{ab}\hat{I}_a\cdot\hat{I}_b$.

Here the summation is taken over the whole system of coupled spins; $\hbar$ denotes the reduced Planck constant; $\gamma_a$ denotes the gyromagnetic ratio of spin a; $\sigma_a$ denotes the isotropic part of the chemical shift for the a-th spin; $I_a$ denotes the spin operator of the a-th spin; $B_0$ is the external magnetic field experienced by all considered spins, and; $J_{ab}$ is the J-coupling constant between spins a and b.

Importantly, the relative strength of $\hat{H}_z$ and $\hat{H}_J$ (and therefore the spin dynamics behavior of such a system) depends on the magnetic field. For example, in conventional NMR, $|B_0|$ is typically larger than 1 T, so the Larmor frequency $\nu_0=-\gamma B_0/2\pi$ of ^{1}H exceeds tens of MHz. This is much larger than $J$-coupling values which are typically Hz to hundreds of Hz. In this limit, $\hat{H}_J$ is a perturbation to $\hat{H}_z$. In contrast, at nanotesla fields, Larmor frequencies can be much smaller than $J$-couplings, and $\hat{H}_J$ dominates.

=== Polarization ===
Before signals can be detected in a ZULF NMR experiment, it is first necessary to polarize the nuclear spin ensemble, since the signal is proportional to the nuclear spin magnetization. There are a number of methods to generate nuclear spin polarization. The most common is to allow the spins to thermally equilibrate in a magnetic field, and the nuclear spin alignment with the magnetic field due to the Zeeman interaction leads to weak spin polarization. The polarization generated in this way is on the order of 10^{−6} for tesla field-strengths.

An alternative approach is to use hyperpolarization techniques, which are chemical and physical methods to generate nuclear spin polarization. Examples include parahydrogen-induced polarization, spin-exchange optical pumping of noble gas atoms, dissolution dynamic nuclear polarization, and chemically-induced dynamic nuclear polarization.

=== Excitation and spin manipulation ===
NMR experiments require creating a transient non-stationary state of the spin system. In conventional high-field experiments, radio frequency pulses tilt the magnetization from along the main magnetic field direction to the transverse plan. Once in the transverse plan, the magnetization is no longer in a stationary state (or eigenstate) and so it begins to precess about the main magnetic field creating a detectable oscillating magnetic field.

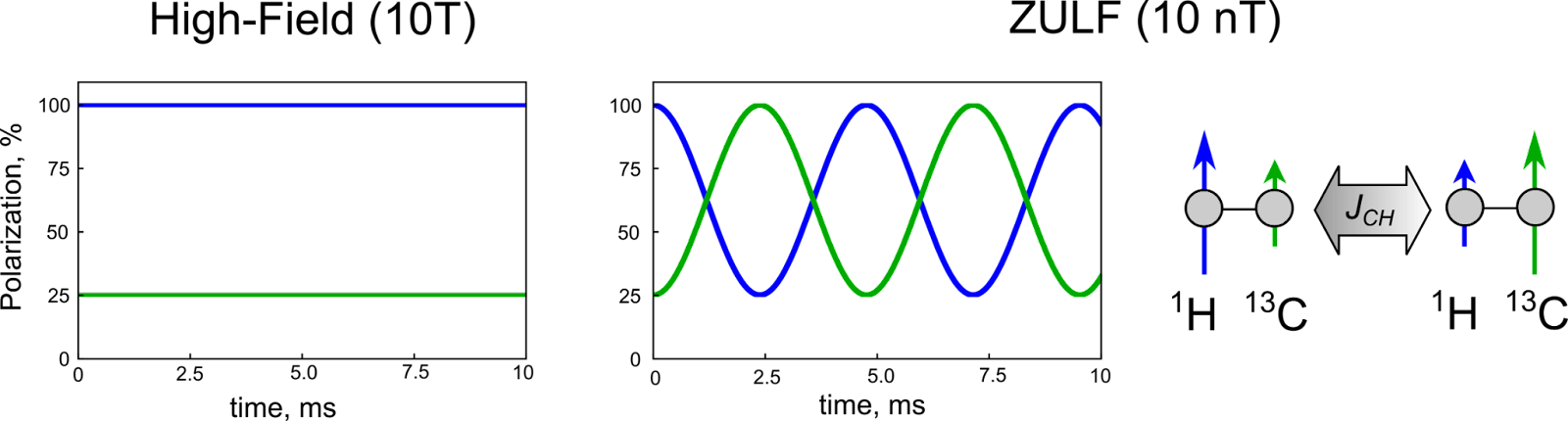
The thermal equilibrium state of a ^{1}H-^{13}C pair in high-field corresponds to a state in which both spins are polarized along the B_{0} field, with ^{1}H polarization about 4 times higher than that of ^{13}C spins. This is a stationary state at high field. If the field is non-adiabatically (rapidly) switched off, the state starts to evolve. The polarization oscillates between the ^{1}H and ^{13}C spins at the J-coupling frequency (210 Hz in this example), and this gives rise to J-spectra in ZULF NMR.

In ZULF experiments, constant magnetic field pulses are used to induce non-stationary states of the spin system. The two main strategies consist of (1) switching of the magnetic field from pseudo-high field to zero (or ultra-low) field, or (2) of ramping down the magnetic field experienced by the spins to zero field in order to convert the Zeeman populations into zero-field eigenstates adiabatically and subsequently in applying a constant magnetic field pulse to induce a coherence between the zero-field eigenstates. In the simple case of a heteronuclear pair of J-coupled spins, both these excitation schemes induce a transition between the singlet and triplet-0 states, which generates a detectable oscillatory magnetic field. More sophisticated pulse sequences have been reported including selective pulses, two-dimensional experiments and decoupling schemes.

=== Signal detection ===
NMR signals are usually detected inductively, but the low frequencies of the electromagnetic radiation emitted by samples in a ZULF experiment makes inductive detection impractical at low fields. Hence, the earliest approach for measuring zero-field NMR in solid samples was via field-cycling techniques. The field cycling involves three steps: preparation, evolution and detection. In the preparation stage, a field is applied in order to magnetize the nuclear spins. Then the field is suddenly switched to zero to initiate the evolution interval and the magnetization evolves under the zero-field Hamiltonian. After a time period, the field is again switched on and the signal is detected inductively at high field. In a single field cycle, the magnetization observed corresponds only to a single value of the zero-field evolution time. The time-varying magnetization can be detected by repeating the field cycle with incremented lengths of the zero-field interval, and hence the evolution and decay of the magnetization is measured point by point. The Fourier transform of this magnetization will result to the zero-field absorption spectrum.

The emergence of highly sensitive magnetometry techniques has allowed for the detection of zero-field NMR signals in situ. Examples include superconducting quantum interference devices (SQUIDs), magnetoresistive sensors, and SERF atomic magnetometers. SQUIDs have high sensitivity, but require cryogenic conditions to operate, which makes them practically somewhat difficult to employ for the detection of chemical or biological samples. Magnetoresistive sensors are less sensitive, but are much easier to handle and to bring close to the NMR sample which is advantageous since proximity improves sensitivity. The most common sensors employed in ZULF NMR experiments are optically-pumped magnetometers, which have high sensitivity and can be placed in close proximity to an NMR sample.

== Definition of the ZULF regime ==
NMR resonances of a ^{1}H-^{13}C spin pair with a 100 Hz J-coupling under different external magnetic fields.

The boundaries between zero-, ultralow-, low- and high-field NMR are not rigorously defined, although approximate working definitions are in routine use for experiments involving small molecules in solution. The boundary between zero and ultralow field is usually defined as the field at which the nuclear spin precession frequency matches the spin relaxation rate, i.e., at zero field the nuclear spins relax faster than they precess about the external field. The boundary between ultralow and low field is usually defined as the field at which Larmor frequency differences between different nuclear spin species match the spin-spin (J or dipolar) couplings, i.e., at ultralow field spin-spin couplings dominate and the Zeeman interaction is a perturbation. The boundary between low and high field is more ambiguous and these terms are used differently depending on the application or research topic. In the context of ZULF NMR, the boundary is defined as the field at which chemical shift differences between nuclei of the same isotopic species in a sample match the spin-spin couplings.

Note that these definitions strongly depend on the sample being studied, and the field regime boundaries can vary by orders of magnitude depending on sample parameters such as the nuclear spin species, spin-spin coupling strengths, and spin relaxation times.

== See also ==
- Earth's field NMR
- Low field NMR
