= Low field nuclear magnetic resonance =

Low field NMR spans a range of different nuclear magnetic resonance (NMR) modalities, going from NMR conducted in permanent magnets, supporting magnetic fields of a few tesla (T), all the way down to zero field NMR, where the Earth's field is carefully shielded such that magnetic fields of nanotesla (nT) are achieved where nuclear spin precession is close to zero. In a broad sense, Low-field NMR is the branch of NMR that is not conducted in superconducting high-field magnets. Low field NMR also includes Earth's field NMR where simply the Earth's magnetic field is exploited to cause nuclear spin-precession which is detected. With magnetic fields on the order of μT and below magnetometers such as SQUIDs or atomic magnetometers (among others) are used as detectors. "Normal" high field NMR relies on the detection of spin-precession with inductive detection with a simple coil. However, this detection modality becomes less sensitive as the magnetic field and the associated frequencies decrease. Hence the push toward alternative detection methods at very low fields.

== Readings ==
- Blümich, Bernhard; Casanova, Federico; Appelt, Stephan (2009). "NMR at low magnetic fields". Chemical Physics Letters. 477 (4–6). Elsevier BV: 231–240. Bibcode:2009CPL...477..231B. doi:10.1016/j.cplett.2009.06.096. ISSN 0009-2614. S2CID 95508271.
- Volegov, P.L.; Matlachov, A.N.; Kraus, R.H. (2006). "Ultra-low field NMR measurements of liquids and gases with short relaxation times". Journal of Magnetic Resonance. 183 (1). Elsevier BV: 134–141. Bibcode:2006JMagR.183..134V. doi:10.1016/j.jmr.2006.07.021. ISSN 1090-7807. PMID 16945561.
- Theis, T.; Ganssle, P.; Kervern, G.; Knappe, S.; Kitching, J.; Ledbetter, M. P.; Budker, D.; Pines, A. (2011-05-01). "Parahydrogen-enhanced zero-field nuclear magnetic resonance". Nature Physics. 7 (7). Springer Science and Business Media LLC: 571–575. arXiv:1102.5378. Bibcode:2011NatPh...7..571T. doi:10.1038/nphys1986. ISSN 1745-2473. S2CID 33432816.
- Vesanen, Panu T.; Nieminen, Jaakko O.; Zevenhoven, Koos C. J.; Dabek, Juhani; Parkkonen, Lauri T.; et al. (2012-07-17). "Hybrid ultra-low-field MRI and magnetoencephalography system based on a commercial whole-head neuromagnetometer". Magnetic Resonance in Medicine. 69 (6). Wiley: 1795–1804. doi:10.1002/mrm.24413. ISSN 0740-3194. PMID 22807201. S2CID 40026232.
