= Proton magnetometer =

Instrument which measures very small variations in the Earth's magnetic field

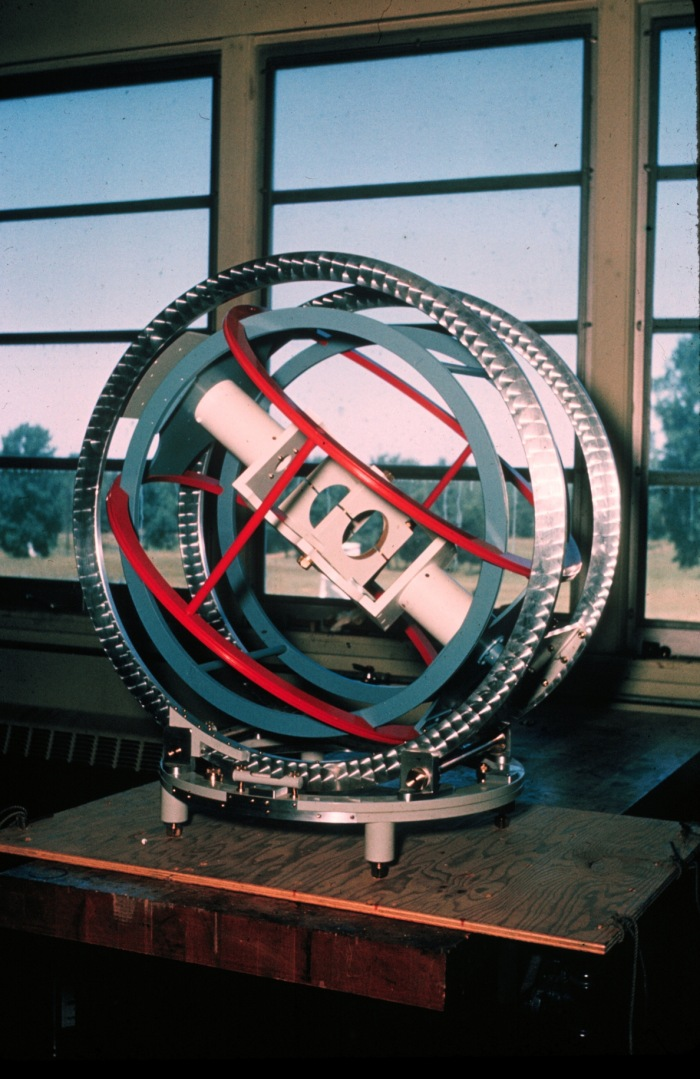
Proton magnetometer from 1967.

A proton magnetometer, also known as a proton precession magnetometer (PPM), uses the principle of Earth's field nuclear magnetic resonance (EFNMR) to measure very small variations in the Earth's magnetic field, allowing ferrous objects on land and at sea to be detected.

It is used in land-based archaeology to map the positions of demolished walls and buildings, and at sea to locate wrecked ships, sometimes for recreational diving.

PPMs were once widely used in mineral exploration. They have largely been superseded by Overhauser effect magnetometers and alkali vapour (caesium, rubidium, and potassium) or helium magnetometers, which sample faster and are more sensitive.

== Principles of operation ==
A direct current flowing in a solenoid creates a strong magnetic field around a hydrogen-rich fluid (kerosine and decane are popular; water can also be used), causing some of the protons to align with that field. The current is then interrupted, and as protons realign themselves with the ambient magnetic field, they precess at a frequency that is directly proportional to the magnetic field. This produces a weak rotating magnetic field that is picked up by a (sometimes separate) inductor, amplified electronically, and fed to a digital frequency counter whose output is typically scaled and displayed directly as field strength or output as digital data.

The relationship between the frequency of the induced current and the strength of the magnetic field is called the proton gyromagnetic ratio, and is equal to 0.042576 Hz nT^{−1}. Because the precession frequency depends only on atomic constants and the strength of the ambient magnetic field, the accuracy of this type of magnetometer can reach 1 ppm.

The frequency of Earth's field NMR for protons varies between approximately 900 Hz near the equator to 4.2 kHz near the geomagnetic poles. These magnetometers can be moderately sensitive if several tens of watts are available to power the aligning process. If measurements are taken once per second, standard deviations in the readings is in the 0.01 nT to 0.1 nT range, and variations of about 0.1 nT can be detected.

For hand/backpack carried units, PPM sample rates are typically limited to less than one sample per second. Measurements are typically taken with the sensor held at fixed locations at approximately 10 meter increments.

The main sources of measurement errors are magnetic impurities in the sensor, errors in the measurement of the frequency and ferrous material on the operator and the instruments, as well as rotation of the sensor as a measurement is taken.

Portable instruments are also limited by sensor volume (weight) and power consumption. PPMs work in field gradients up to 3,000 nT m^{−1} which is adequate from most mineral exploration work. For higher gradient tolerance such as mapping banded iron formations and detecting large ferrous objects Overhauser magnetometers can handle 10,000 nT m^{−1} and Caesium magnetometers can handle 30,000 nT m^{−1}.

== Proton magnetometer in archaeology ==
In 1958 Glenn A. Black and Eli Lilly, following the work of Martin Aitken and his associates at the Oxford University (UK) Archaeometric Laboratory, used proton magnetometers to locate and map buried archaeological features, including iron objects in the soil, thermoremanent magnetization of fired clays, and differences in the magnetic susceptibility of disturbed soils. During 1961–1963, they surveyed more than 100,000 square feet (9,300 m^{2}) of the Angel Mounds State Historic Site in Indiana and excavated more than 7,000 square feet (650 m^{2}) to match anomalous magnetometer readings with the archaeological features that produced them. This was the first systematic use of a proton magnetometer for archaeological research in North America.

== See also ==
- NMR
