= Nanalysis =

Canadian scientific instrument manufacturer

Nanalysis (Nanalysis Scientific Corp.) is a scientific instrument manufacturer based in Calgary, Alberta, Canada. Established in 2009, Nanalysis specializes in the production of compact Nuclear Magnetic Resonance (NMR) spectroscopic instrumentation. As a new public company it is trading on the TSX Venture Exchange (TSXV) under the ticker symbol NSCI since June 2019, and later on the Frankfurt Stock Exchange (FRA) under the ticker symbol 1N1.

== Products ==
The first product introduced by Nanalysis in 2013 was the 60 MHz NMReady benchtop NMR spectrometer, capable of observing multinuclear 1D and 2D NMR spectra. The Nanalysis 60 MHz was the first portable, high-resolution 60 MHz benchtop NMR spectrometer released on the market. Notable for their ease of use, low-maintenance, accessibility, affordability and automatability, these instruments can be used to increase the accessibility of NMR spectroscopy to undergraduate students, streamline the workflow for chemical professionals in all types of industries (oil & gas, chemical, pharma, biotech, food processing etc.), and be used to expand the use of NMR in industry without dependence on the larger, more powerful NMR devices.

In 2019, the company announced the 100 MHz spectrometer, representing the highest field permanent magnet based benchtop NMR available on the market to expand the range of molecules that can be resolved using benchtop NMR spectroscopy. Designed with flexibility in mind, the instruments can be configured as traditional NMR spectrometers or programmed as analyzers for specific industrial applications (oil and gas, chemical, pharma, biotech, food science, atomic agencies, cannabis, mining). With a global sales network, manufacturing, product development and corporate headquarters located in Calgary, Alberta, Canada, Nanalysis has sold instruments in over 45 countries. Their product line has been widely recognized, including being named Company of the Year in Global Portable NMR in the prestigious Frost & Sullivan award for three consecutive years.
