= Structure-based assignment =

Structure-Based Assignment (SBA) is a technique to accelerate the resonance assignment which is a key bottleneck of NMR (Nuclear magnetic resonance) structural biology. A homologous (similar) protein is used as a template to the target protein in SBA. This template protein provides prior structural information about the target protein and leads to faster resonance assignment . By analogy, in X-ray Crystallography, the molecular replacement technique allows solution of the crystallographic phase problem when a homologous structural model is known, thereby facilitating rapid structure determination. Some of the SBA algorithms are CAP which is an RNA assignment algorithm which performs an exhaustive search over all permutations, MARS which is a program for robust automatic backbone assignment and Nuclear Vector Replacement (NVR) which is a molecular replacement like approach for SBA of resonances and sparse Nuclear Overhauser Effect (NOE)'s.
