= Magnetic resonance microscopy =

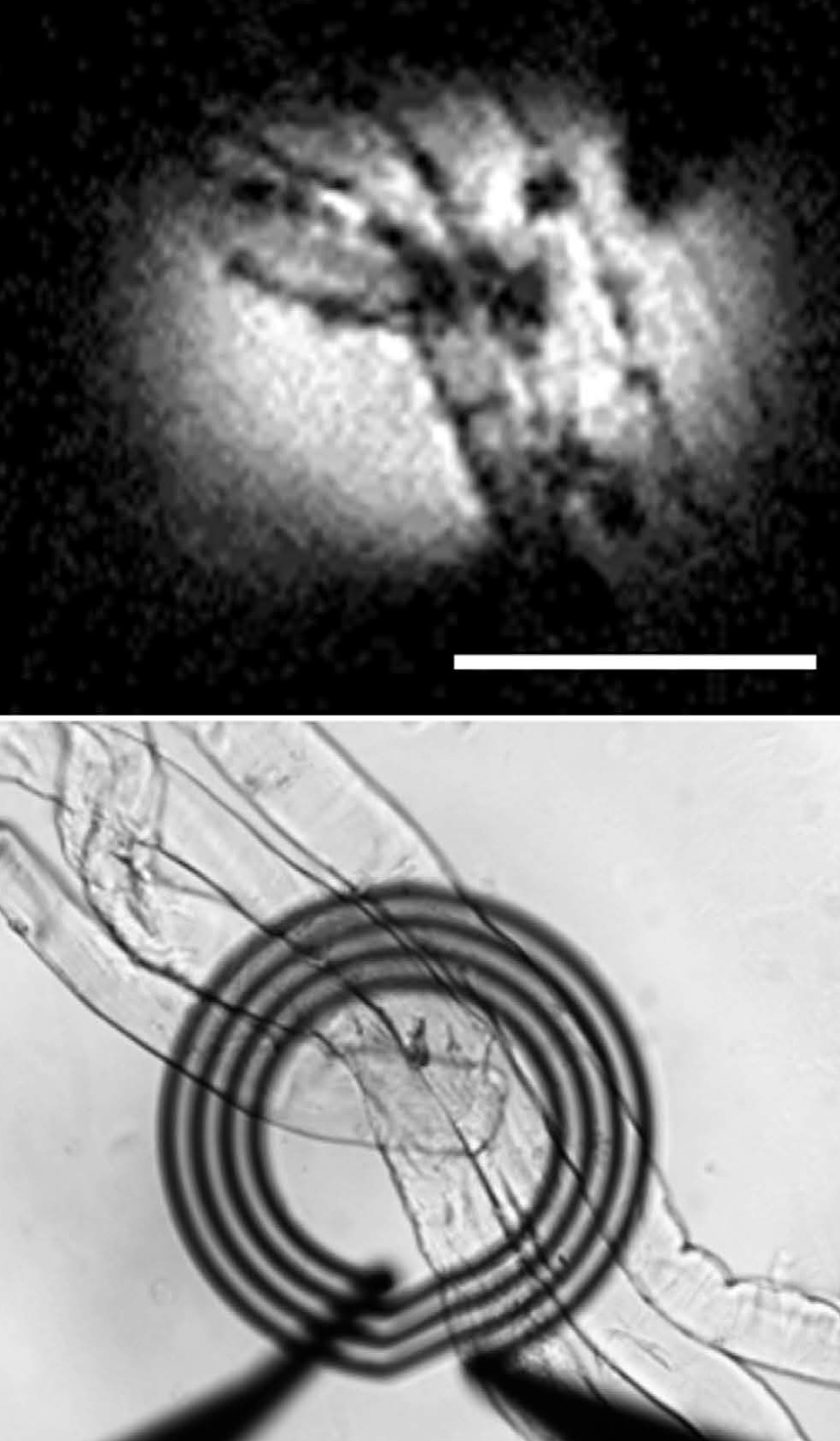
Top: MRM image of mouse muscle fibers stained with ferric ammonium citrate, scale bar 200 μm. Bottom: conventional micrograph showing the MRM coil.

Magnetic resonance microscopy (MRM, μMRI) is magnetic resonance imaging (MRI) at a microscopic level down to the scale of microns. The first definition of MRM was MRI having voxel resolutions of better than 100 μm.

== Nomenclature ==
Magnetic resonance microscopy refers to very high resolution MRI imaging (down to nanometer scale, in some cases comparable with histopathology). The term MR microscopy is most widely used by the High Resolution Magnetic Resonance Imaging department at Duke University, headed by Dr. G. Allan Johnson, and the National High Magnetic Field Lab group at AMRIS, University of Florida/Florida State University.

== Differences between MRI and MRM ==
- MRM represent a higher evolution of MRI
- MRM employs a much stronger magnetic field, which is conducted on a much smaller scale.
- Resolution: Medical MRI resolution is typically about 1 mm; the desired resolution of MRM is 100 μm or smaller to 10 μm, comparable with histology.
- Specimen size: Medical MRI machines are designed so that a patient may fit inside. MRM chambers are usually small, typically less than 1 cm^{3} for the imaging of rats, mice and rodents. BrukerBio Spin Company, Billerica, MA specialises in the supply of different microimaging probes (5 mm – 75 mm) for ex vivo/in vivo imaging of excised biological samples.

== Current status of MRM ==
Although MRI is very common for medical applications, MRM is still developing in laboratories up to resonance frequencies of 1000 MHz^{[1]} (for nuclear magnetic resonance; electron magnetic resonance commonly operates at much higher frequencies). The major barriers for practical MRM include:

- Magnetic field gradient: High gradient focus of magnetic resonance in a smaller volume (smaller point spread function), results in a better spatial resolution. The gradients for MRM are typically 50 to 100 times those of clinical systems. However, the construction of radio frequency (RF) coils used in MRM does not allow ultrahigh gradients.
- Sensitivity: Because the voxels for MRM can be 1/100,000 of those in MRI, the signal is proportionately weaker.

== Alternative MRM ==
Magnetic resonance force microscopy (MRFM) has nm-scale resolution. It improves the sensitivity issue by introducing microfabricated cantilevers to measure tiny signals. The magnetic gradient is generated by a micrometre-scale magnetic tip, yielding a typical gradient 10 million times larger than those of clinical systems. This technique is still in the early phase of development. Because the specimen needs to be in a high vacuum at cryogenic temperatures, MRFM can be used only for solid state materials.
