= Solvent suppression =

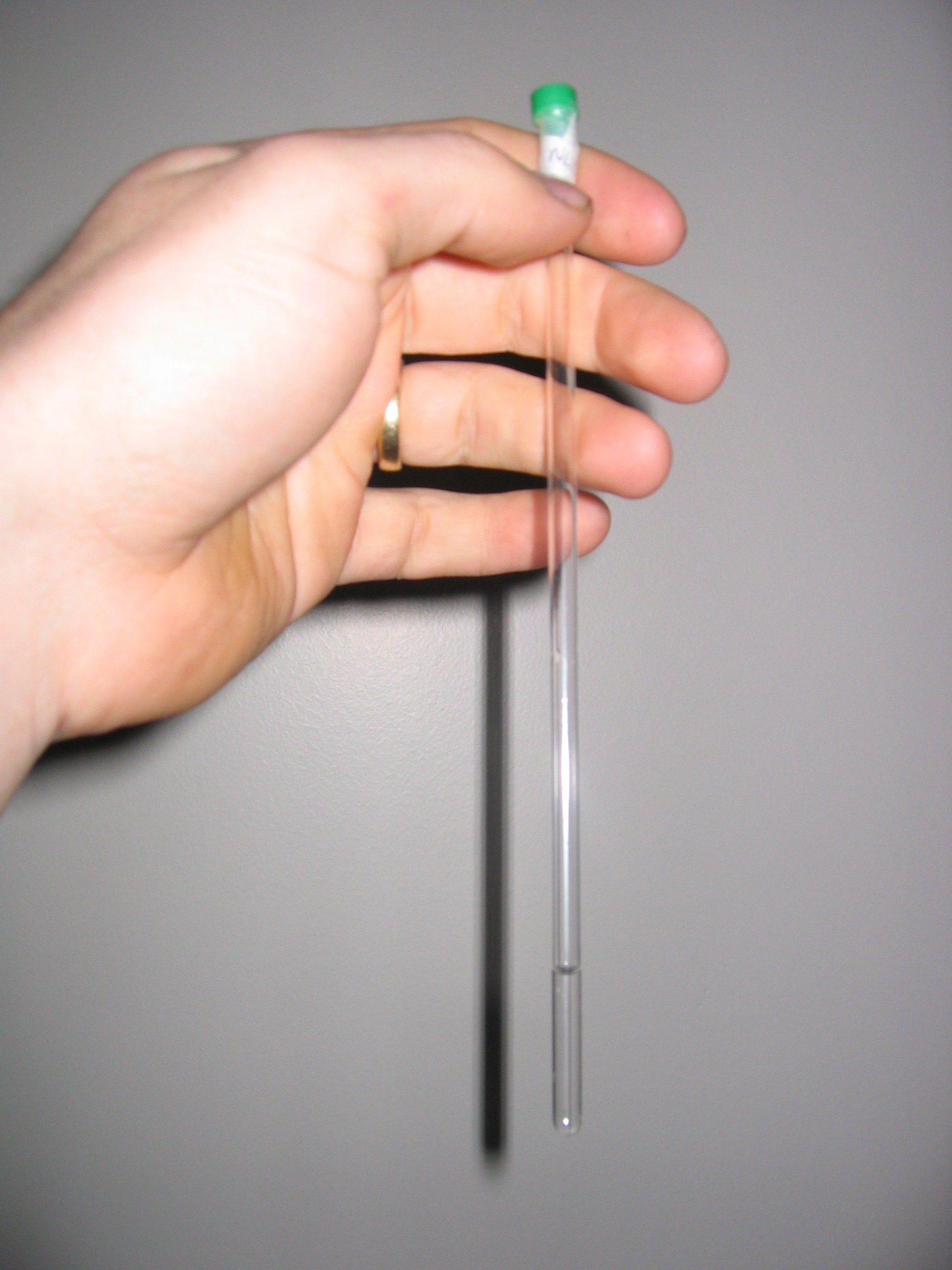
An NMR tube with a sample dissolved in a solvent

Solvent suppression is any technique in nuclear magnetic resonance spectroscopy (NMR) to decrease undesired signal from a sample's solvent.

== Introduction ==
In liquid-state NMR spectroscopy, the sample to be studied is dissolved in a solvent. Typically, the concentration of the solvent is much higher than the concentration of the solutes of interest. The signal from the solvent can overwhelm that of the solute, and the NMR instrument may not collect any meaningful data. Solvent suppression techniques are particularly important in protein NMR where the solvent often includes H_{2}O as well as D_{2}O.
