= Nuclear quadrupole resonance =

Chemical analysis technique

Nuclear quadrupole resonance spectroscopy or NQR is a chemical analysis technique related to nuclear magnetic resonance (NMR). Unlike NMR, NQR transitions of nuclei can be detected in the absence of a magnetic field, and for this reason NQR spectroscopy is referred to as "zero Field NMR". The NQR resonance is mediated by the interaction of the electric field gradient (EFG) with the quadrupole moment of the nuclear charge distribution. Unlike NMR, NQR is applicable only to solids and not liquids, because in liquids the electric field gradient at the nucleus averages to zero (the EFG tensor has trace zero). Because the EFG at the location of a nucleus in a given substance is determined primarily by the valence electrons involved in the particular bond with other nearby nuclei, the NQR frequency at which transitions occur is unique for a given substance. A particular NQR frequency in a compound or crystal is proportional to the product of the nuclear quadrupole moment, a property of the nucleus, and the EFG in the neighborhood of the nucleus. It is this product which is termed the nuclear quadrupole coupling constant for a given isotope in a material and can be found in tables of known NQR transitions. In NMR, an analogous but not identical phenomenon is the coupling constant, which is also the result of an internuclear interaction between nuclei in the analyte.

== Principle ==
Any nucleus with more than one unpaired nuclear particle (protons or neutrons) will have a charge distribution which results in an electric quadrupole moment. Allowed nuclear energy levels are shifted unequally due to the interaction of the nuclear charge with an electric field gradient supplied by the non-uniform distribution of electron density (e.g. from bonding electrons) and/or surrounding ions. As in the case of NMR, irradiation of the nucleus with a burst of RF electromagnetic radiation may result in absorption of some energy by the nucleus which can be viewed as a perturbation of the quadrupole energy level. Unlike the NMR case, NQR absorption takes place in the absence of an external magnetic field. Application of an external static field to a quadrupolar nucleus splits the quadrupole levels by the energy predicted from the Zeeman interaction. The technique is very sensitive to the nature and symmetry of the bonding around the nucleus. It can characterize phase transitions in solids when performed at varying temperature. Due to symmetry, the shifts become averaged to zero in the liquid phase, so NQR spectra can only be measured for solids.

=== Analogy with NMR ===
In the case of NMR, nuclei with spin ≥ 1/2 have a magnetic dipole moment so that their energies are split by a magnetic field, allowing resonance absorption of energy related to the Larmor frequency:

$\omega_L = \gamma B$

where $\gamma$ is the gyromagnetic ratio and $B$ is the (normally applied) magnetic field external to the nucleus.

In the case of NQR, nuclei with spin ≥ 1, such as ^{14}N (spin 1), ^{17}O (spin 5/2), ^{35}Cl (spin 3/2) and ^{63}Cu (spin 3/2), also have an electric quadrupole moment Q which has energy levels between which resonance can be observed, even in the absence of a magnetic field. Nuclei with spin 1 or 3/2 give only a single resonance line, but a nucleus with spin 5/2 gives two resonance lines, one at double the frequency of the other.

The nuclear quadrupole moment is associated with non-spherical nuclear charge distributions. As such it is a measure of the degree to which the nuclear charge distribution deviates from that of a sphere; that is, the prolate or oblate shape of the nucleus. NQR is a direct observation of the interaction of the quadrupole moment with the local electric field gradient (EFG) created by the electronic structure of its environment. The NQR transition frequencies are proportional to the product of the electric quadrupole moment of the nucleus and a measure of the strength of the local EFG:

$\omega_Q \sim \frac{e^2 Q q}{\hbar} = C_q$

where q is related to the largest principal component of the EFG tensor at the nucleus. $C_q$ is referred to as the quadrupole coupling constant.

In principle, the NQR experimenter could apply a specified EFG in order to influence $\omega_Q$ just as the NMR experimenter is free to choose the Larmor frequency by adjusting the magnetic field. However, in solids, the strength of the EFG is many kV/m^2, making the application of EFG's for NQR in the manner that external magnetic fields are chosen for NMR impractical. Consequently, the NQR spectrum of a substance is specific to the substance - and NQR spectrum is a so called "chemical fingerprint." Because NQR frequencies are not chosen by the experimenter, they can be difficult to find making NQR a technically difficult technique to carry out. Since NQR is done in an environment without a static (or DC) magnetic field, it is sometimes called "zero field NMR". Many NQR transition frequencies depend strongly upon temperature.

=== Derivation of resonance frequency ===
Consider a nucleus with a non-zero quadrupole moment $\textbf{Q}$ and charge density $\rho(\textbf{r})$, which is surrounded by a potential $V(\textbf{r})$. This potential may be produced by the electrons as stated above, whose probability distribution might be non-isotropic in general. The potential energy in this system equals to the integral over the charge distribution $\rho(\textbf{r})$ and the potential $V(\textbf{r})$ within a domain $\mathcal{D}$:

$$U = - \int_{\mathcal{D}}d^3r \rho(\textbf{r})V(\textbf{r})$$
One can write the potential as a Taylor-expansion at the center of the considered nucleus. This method corresponds to the multipole expansion in cartesian coordinates (note that the equations below use the Einstein sum-convention):

$$V(\textbf{r}) = V(0) + \left[ \left( \frac{\partial V}{\partial x_i}\right)\Bigg\vert_0 \cdot x_i \right] + \frac{1}{2} \left[ \left( \frac{\partial^2 V}{\partial x_i x_j}\right) \Bigg\vert_0 \cdot x_i x_j \right] + ...$$

The first term involving $V(0)$ will not be relevant and can therefore be omitted. Since nuclei do not have an electric dipole moment $\textbf{p}$, which would interact with the electric field $\textbf{E} = - \mathrm{grad} V(\textbf{r})$, the first derivatives can also be neglected. One is therefore left with all nine combinations of second derivatives. However if one deals with a homogeneous oblate or prolate nucleus the matrix $Q_{ij}$ will be diagonal and elements with $i \neq j$ vanish. This leads to a simplification because the equation for the potential energy now contains only the second derivatives in respect to the same variable:

$$U = - \frac{1}{2} \int_{\mathcal{D}}d^3r \rho(\textbf{r}) \left[ \left( \frac{\partial^2 V}{\partial x_i^2}\right) \Bigg\vert_0 \cdot x_i^2  \right] = - \frac{1}{2} \int_{\mathcal{D}}d^3r \rho(\textbf{r}) \left[ \left( \frac{\partial E_i}{\partial x_i}\right) \Bigg\vert_0 \cdot x_i^2  \right] = - \frac{1}{2} \left( \frac{\partial E_i}{\partial x_i}\right) \Bigg\vert_0 \cdot \int_{\mathcal{D}}d^3r \left[\rho(\textbf{r}) \cdot x_i^2 \right]$$
The remaining terms in the integral are related to the charge distribution and hence the quadrupole moment. The formula can be simplified even further by introducing the electric field gradient $V_{ii} = \frac{\partial^2 V}{\partial x_i^2} = eq$ , choosing the z-axis as the one with the maximal principal component $Q_{zz}$ and using the Laplace equation to obtain the proportionality written above. For an $I = 3/2$ nucleus one obtains with the frequency-energy relation $E = h\nu$:

$$\nu = \frac{1}{2}\left(\frac{e^2qQ}{h}\right)$$

== Applications ==
NQR probes the interaction between the nuclear quadrupole moment and the electric field gradient at the nucleus. Since the EFG tensor arises from the electron cloud density around a particular region, NQR is highly sensitive to changes in electron charge distribution surrounding the NQR-active nucleus. Such sensitivity makes NQR spectroscopy a useful method for the study of bonding, structural features, phase transitions, and molecular dynamics in solid-state compounds.

For example, NQR spectroscopy has proven to be a useful tool in the realm of pharmaceuticals. More specifically, the application of ^{14}N-NQR has allowed for the differentiation of enantiomeric compounds from racemic mixtures; namely in, D-serine and L-serine. These two compounds, despite their similar composition, possess distinct properties. On one hand, D-serine is a potential biomarker for Alzheimer’s disease as well as a treatment for schizophrenia. L-serine, on the other hand, is a drug undergoing FDA-approved human clinical trials due to its potential in treating amyotrophic lateral sclerosis. Through NQR the mixture of L/D-serine can be differentiated from pure L/D-serine. Note that L-serine and D-serine cannot be differentiated due to being related by a reflection.

Similarly, NQR possesses the ability to differentiate between crystalline polymorphs. Sulfonamide-containing drugs, for example, have shown to be susceptible to polymorphism. Differences in NQR frequencies, along with the quadrupole coupling constants and asymmetry parameters, allow differentiation between polymorphs as can be done with enantiomeric compounds. Distinguishing between polymorphs in such a manner makes NQR a powerful tool for authenticating drugs against counterfeits.

There are several research groups around the world currently working on ways to use NQR to detect explosives. Units designed to detect landmines and explosives concealed in luggage have been tested. A detection system consists of a radio frequency (RF) power source, a coil to produce the magnetic excitation field and a detector circuit which monitors for a RF NQR response coming from the explosive component of the object.

A fake device known as the ADE 651 claimed to exploit NQR to detect explosives but in fact could do no such thing. Nonetheless, the device was successfully sold for millions to dozens of countries, including the government of Iraq.

Another practical use for NQR is measuring the water/gas/oil coming out of an oil well in realtime. This particular technique allows local or remote monitoring of the extraction process, calculation of the well's remaining capacity and the water/detergents ratio the input pump must send to efficiently extract oil.

Due to the strong temperature dependence of the NQR frequency, it can be used as a precise temperature sensor with resolution on the order of 10^{−4} °C.

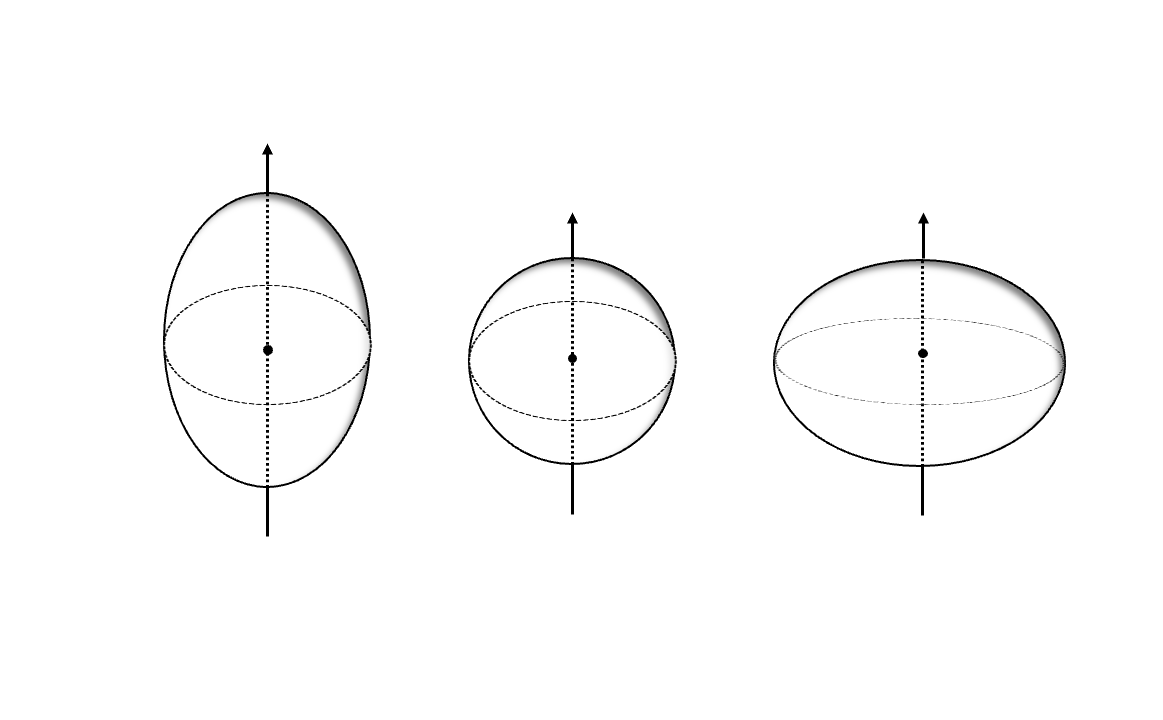
Non-spherical symmetry in nuclei. Shown from left to right are a stretched (prolate) nucleus, a spherical nucleus, and a compressed (oblate) nucleus.

The main limitation for this technique arises from isotopic abundance. NQR requires the presence of a non-zero quadrupole moment, which is only observed in nuclei with a nuclear spin greater than or equal to one (I ≥ 1) and whose local charge distribution deviates from spherical symmetry. NQR requires fairly large sample sizes due to the signals being of very low intensity. This poses experimental obstacles due to a large majority of NQR-active nuclei having low isotopic abundances. Nevertheless, NQR spectroscopy has still proven useful in various contexts – as discussed above.
