= Planar Doppler velocimetry =

Planar Doppler Velocimetry (PDV), also referred to as Doppler Global Velocimetry (DGV), determines flow velocity across a plane by measuring the Doppler shift in frequency of light scattered by particles contained in the flow. The Doppler shift, Δf_{d}, is related to the fluid velocity. The relatively small frequency shift (order 1 GHz) is discriminated using an atomic or molecular vapor filter. This approach is conceptually similar to what is now known as Filtered Rayleigh Scattering (Miles and Lempert, 1990).

== Equipment ==
Up to now, a typical one-component PDV instrument utilizes a pulsed injection-seeded Nd:YAG laser, one or two scientific grade CCD cameras and a molecular iodine filter. The laser is used to illuminate a plane of the flow with narrow spectral linewidth light. The Doppler shifted scattered light is then split into two paths using a beamsplitter and imaged onto the camera(s). In this manner the absolute absorption of scattered light, as it passes through an iodine cell placed in one of the beam paths, is measured at every spatial location within the object plane. For scattering by relatively large (i.e. Mie scattering) particles, this absorption is a function of particle velocity alone. Accurate calibration and image mapping algorithms have been developed with the result that velocity accuracies of ~1–2 m/s are possible. More details concerning the history of PDV, the art of its application and recent advances can be found in comprehensive review articles by Elliott and Beutner (1999) and Samimy and Wernet (2000).

== Strengths ==
PDV is well suited for high-speed flow measurements where concerns about particle seeding make PIV impractical. Although PDV requires particles to scatter light, individual particles do not need to be imaged thus allowing the use of much smaller seed particles and making the measurements less sensitive to particle seed density. For example, in some unheated supersonic flow facilities it is possible to use condensation of a vapor, such as water, acetone or ethanol, to produce seed particles in the flow. Particles formed using this method, known as product formation, have been estimated to be ~50 micrometres in diameter.

Unlike PIV, PDV requires only a single image of the flow field. This image may taken over a long period (relative to characteristics times scales within the flow) to produce time-averaged images or alternatively using a single laser pulse (approximately 10ns) to obtain a measurement of instantaneous flow velocities. The duration of a single laser pulse is at least an order of magnitude shorter than pulse separations used within PIV. This feature of PDV enables improved resolution of sharp velocity discontinuities such as shock waves.

In addition, PDV has an inherently higher resolution than PIV (where small image subregions are used to determine the velocity typically 16 x 16 pixels) and a velocity measurement may be obtained for each pixel within the flow image. However, particularly in the case of instantaneous measurement using PDV, some pixel binning is used to attenuate the deleterious effects of laser speckle and improve the Signal-to-Noise ratio.

== Weaknesses ==
The main weakness of PDV is the complex optical set up required to get accurate measurements. For each component of velocity, two images (signal and reference) are required, which typically necessitates two cameras. To obtain all three components of velocity, therefore, requires the simultaneous use of up to six cameras, although recent work by Charrett et al. (2006) and Hawkes et al. (2004) has progressively enabled the number of cameras required from six to a single camera. In addition, the laser used for the measurements must be narrow linewidth, which is typically performed by injection seeding of the laser cavity. Even with seeding, the laser frequency can fluctuate with time and must be monitored. These introduce additional complexity to the experimental set-up. PDV systems, although used in many laboratories, are not yet commercially available and can be quite expensive (equipment, data processing, experience, labor, etc.) if built from scratch.
