= Frequency shift =

In the physical sciences and in telecommunication, the term frequency shift may refer to:

- Any change in frequency
- A Doppler shift
- In facsimile, a frequency modulation system where one frequency represents picture black and another frequency represents picture white
- Spectrum shifting in signal processing, see Discrete Fourier transform#Shift theorem

== See also ==
- Frequency mixer
- Voice inversion
