= Magnetization transfer =

Magnetization transfer (MT), in NMR and MRI, refers to the transfer of nuclear spin polarization and/or spin coherence from one population of nuclei to another population of nuclei, and to techniques that make use of these phenomena. There is some ambiguity regarding the precise definition of magnetization transfer, however the general definition given above encompasses all more specific notions. NMR active nuclei, those with non-zero spin, can be energetically coupled to one another under certain conditions. The mechanisms of nuclear-spin energy-coupling have been extensively characterized and are described in the following articles: Angular momentum coupling, Magnetic dipole–dipole interaction, J-coupling, Residual dipolar coupling, Nuclear Overhauser effect, Spin–spin relaxation, and Spin saturation transfer. Alternatively, some nuclei in a chemical system are labile and exchange between non-equivalent environments. A more specific example of this case is presented in the section Chemical Exchange Magnetization transfer.

In either case, magnetization transfer techniques probe the dynamic relationship between two or more distinguishable nuclei populations, in so far as energy exchange between the populations can be induced and measured in an idealized NMR experiment.

== Chemical Exchange Magnetization transfer ==
In magnetic resonance imaging or NMR of macromolecular samples, such as protein solutions, at least two types of water molecules, free (bulk) and bound (hydration), are present. Bulk water molecules have many mechanical degrees of freedom, and motion of such molecules thus exhibits statistically averaged behavior. Because of this uniformity, most free water protons have resonance frequencies very near the average Larmor frequency of all such protons. On a properly acquired NMR spectrum this is seen as a narrow Lorentzian line (at 4.8 ppm, 20 C). Bulk water molecules are also relatively far from magnetic field perturbing macromolecules, such that free water protons experience a more homogeneous magnetic field, which results in slower transverse magnetization dephasing and a longer T_{2}^{*}. Conversely, hydration water molecules are mechanically constrained by extensive interactions with the local macromolecules and hence magnetic field inhomogeneities are not averaged out, which leads to broader resonance lines. This results in faster dephasing of the magnetization that produces the NMR signal and much shorter T_{2} values (<200 μs). Because the T_{2} values are so short, the NMR signal from the protons of bound water is not typically observed in MRI.

However, using an off-resonance saturation pulse to irradiate protons in the bound (hydration) population can have a detectable effect on the NMR signal of the mobile (free) proton pool. When a population of spins is saturated, such that the magnitude of the macroscopic magnetization vector approaches zero, there is no remaining spin polarization with which to produce an NMR signal. Longitudinal relaxation refers to the return of longitudinal spin polarization, which occurs at a rate described by T_{1}. While the number of hydration water molecules may be insufficient to produce an observable signal, exchange of water molecules between the hydration and bulk population allows characterization of the hydration population, and measurement of the rate at which molecules are exchanging between bulk and bound sites. Such experiments are often termed saturation transfer or chemical exchange saturation transfer (CEST), because the signal of the bulk water is observed to decrease when the hydration population is saturated. Considering these techniques from the opposite perspective, that magnetization (i.e. spin polarization) is being transferred from the bulk water to the spin-saturated hydration population, allows one to conceptually unify chemical exchange methods with other techniques that transfer magnetization between nuclei populations. Since the extent of signal decay depends on the exchange rate between free and hydration water, MT can be used to provide an alternative contrast method in addition to T_{1},T_{2}, and proton density differences.

An extension of MT, the magnetization transfer ratio (MTR) has been used in neuroradiology to highlight abnormalities in brain structures. (The MTR is (M_{o}-M_{t})/M_{o}.)

MT is believed to be a nonspecific indicator of the structural integrity of the tissue being imaged. Studies have been conducted to look at demyelination in the brain in patients with multiple sclerosis and found a decrease magnetization transfer ratio in MS brains.

A systematic modulation of the precise frequency offset for the saturation pulse can be plotted against the free-water signal to form a "Z-spectrum". This technique is often referred to as "Z-spectroscopy".

== Magnetization Transfer Lineshapes ==
Semisolid (bound) pools as, previously explained, have very fast T_{2} relaxation leading to a broad frequency profile. This frequency can be modelled as a gaussian, as a Lorentzian, or as a super-Lorentzian. Gaussian line shaped MT are "associated with spins in a rigid system where the spin-spin dipolar interactions are static". Modelling MT as a Lorentzian "is associated with spins where these interactions are averaged out due to motions (i.e. liquids). The Lorentzian lineshape can be described as

$g(2\pi \Delta) = \frac{T_2}{\pi} \frac{1}{[1+(2\pi\Delta T_2)^2]}$, where 1/T_{2} defines the width of the lorentzian.

the Gaussian lineshape can be described as

$g(2\pi \Delta) = \frac{T_2}{\sqrt{2\pi}}\exp\left(\frac{-(2\pi \Delta T_2)^2}{2}\right)$, where 1/T_{2} defines the width of the gaussian.

In contrast to the gaussian and Lorentzian which are both functions in statistics and spectroscopy, the super-Lorentzian lineshape arises solely from the field of Magnetization Transfer. The super-Lorentzian "is a result of the nonzero time-averaged dipolar Hamiltonian $\hat H _d$. In molecules such as lipids, the non-isotropic, planar syummetry of the membrane ensures that this Hamiltonian does not average to zero. The rapid rotation of the molecular about its long axis projects the dipolar interactoins along the symmetry axis for the motion, i.e., the normal to the bilayer. The dipolar Hamiltonian scales with the angle θ between the external magnetic field and the bilayer normal."

$\hat H_{d,\theta} = \hat H_{d,\theta = 0}\left( \frac{3 \cos^2\theta -1}{2} \right)$

As an aside, famously, this equation for the dipolar Hamiltonian is the fundamental of magic angle spinning (MAS) NMR, where solids are spun at the magic angle (54.74°), to cancel out the anisotropy of dipolar coupling. If one assumes θ=0, the lineshape is gaussian, then the super-Lorentzian lineshape is given by:

$g(2\pi\Delta) = \int_0^{\pi/2} d\theta \sin \theta \sqrt{\frac{2}{\pi}}\frac{T_2}{3\cos^2\theta -1} \exp \left(-2 \left(\frac{2\pi\Delta T_2}{|3\cos^2\theta -1|}\right)\right)$

For simulations of Magnetization Transfer effects, these three lineshapes are used in a two-pool model simulating the effects of the semisolid bound pool and the water pool over the course of an experiment. While gaussians and Lorentzian lineshapes have explicit solutions, the super-Lorentzian is numerically integrated. Experimentally, a common MR phantom material- crosslinked Bovine Serum Albumin (BSA) was found to be fit better with a gaussian than with a super-Lorentzian lineshape.

== See also ==
- Magnetic resonance imaging
- Magnetic resonance spectroscopy
