= Nuclear magnetic resonance spectroscopy of nucleic acids =

Nucleic acid NMR is the use of nuclear magnetic resonance spectroscopy to obtain information about the structure and dynamics of nucleic acid molecules, such as DNA or RNA. It is useful for molecules of up to 100 nucleotides, and as of 2003, nearly half of all known RNA structures had been determined by NMR spectroscopy.

NMR has advantages over X-ray crystallography, which is the other method for high-resolution nucleic acid structure determination, in that the molecules are being observed in their natural solution state rather than in a crystal lattice that may affect the molecule's structural properties. It is also possible to investigate dynamics with NMR. This comes at the cost of slightly less accurate and detailed structures than crystallography.

Nucleic acid NMR uses techniques similar to those of protein NMR, but has several differences. Nucleic acids have a smaller percentage of hydrogen atoms, which are the atoms usually observed in NMR, and because nucleic acid double helices are stiff and roughly linear, they do not fold back on themselves to give "long-range" correlations. Nucleic acids also tend to have resonances distributed over a smaller range than proteins, making the spectra potentially more crowded and difficult to interpret.

== Experimental methods ==
Two-dimensional NMR methods are almost always used with nucleic acids. These include correlation spectroscopy (COSY) and total coherence transfer spectroscopy (TOCSY) to detect through-bond nuclear couplings, and nuclear Overhauser effect spectroscopy (NOESY) to detect couplings between nuclei that are close to each other in space. The types of NMR usually done with nucleic acids are ^{1}H NMR, ^{13}C NMR, ^{15}N NMR, and ^{31}P NMR. ^{19}F NMR is also useful if nonnatural nucleotides such as 2'-fluoro-2'-deoxyadenosine are incorporated into the nucleic acid strand, as natural nucleic acids do not contain any fluorine atoms.

^{1}H and ^{31}P have near 100% natural abundance, while ^{13}C and ^{15}N have low natural abundances. For these latter two nuclei, there is the capability of isotopically enriching desired atoms within the molecules, either uniformly or in a site-specific manner. Nucleotides uniformly enriched in ^{13}C and/or ^{15}N can be obtained through biochemical methods, by performing polymerase chain reaction or in vitro transcription using dNTPs or NTPs derived from bacteria grown in an isotopically enriched environment. Site-specific isotope enrichment must be done through chemical synthesis of the labeled nucleoside phosphoramidite monomer and of the full strand; however these are difficult and expensive to synthesize.

Because nucleic acids have a relatively large number of protons which are solvent-exchangeable, nucleic acid NMR is generally not done in D_{2}O solvent as is common with other types of NMR. This is because the deuterium in the solvent would replace the exchangeable protons and extinguish their signal. H_{2}O is used as a solvent, and other methods are used to eliminate the strong solvent signal, such as saturating the solvent signal before the normal pulse sequence ("presaturation"), which works best a low temperature to prevent exchange of the saturated solvent protons with the nucleic acid protons; or exciting only resonances of interest ("selective excitation"), which has the additional, potentially undesired effect of distorting the peak amplitudes.

== Structure determination ==
The exchangeable and non-exchangeable protons are usually assigned to their specific peaks as two independent groups. For exchangeable protons, which are for the most part the protons involved in base pairing, NOESY can be used to find through-space correlations between on neighboring bases, allowing an entire duplex molecule to be assigned through sequential walking. For nonexchangable protons, many of which are on the sugar moiety of the nucleic acid, COSY and TOCSY are used to identify systems of coupled nuclei, while NOESY is again used to correlate the sugar to the base and each base to its neighboring base. For duplex DNA nonexchangeable protons the H6/H8 protons on the base correlate to their counterparts on neighboring bases and to the H1' proton on the sugar, allowing sequential walking to be done. For RNA, the differences in chemical structure and helix geometry make this assignment more technically difficult, but still possible. The sequential walking methodology is not possible for non-double helical nucleic acid structures, nor for the Z-DNA form, making assignment of resonances more difficult.

Parameters taken from the spectrum, mainly NOESY cross-peaks and coupling constants, can be used to determine local structural features such as glycosidic bond angles, dihedral angles (using the Karplus equation), and sugar pucker conformations. The presence or absence of imino proton resonances, or of coupling between ^{15}N atoms across a hydrogen bond, indicates the presence or absence of basepairing. For large-scale structure, these local parameters must be supplemented with other structural assumptions or models, because errors add up as the double helix is traversed, and unlike with proteins, the double helix does not have a compact interior and does not fold back upon itself. However, long-range orientation information can be obtained through residual dipolar coupling experiments in a medium which imposes a weak alignment on the nucleic acid molecules.

Recently, solid-state NMR methodology has been introduced for the structure determination of nucleic acids. The protocol implies two approaches: nucleotide-type selective labeling of RNA and usage of heteronuclear correlation experiments.

NMR is also useful for investigating nonstandard geometries such as bent helices, non-Watson–Crick basepairing, and coaxial stacking. It has been especially useful in probing the structure of natural RNA oligonucleotides, which tend to adopt complex conformations such as stem-loops and pseudoknots. Interactions between RNA and metal ions can be probed by a number of methods, including observing changes in chemical shift upon ion binding, observing line broadening for paramagnetic ion species, and observing intermolecular NOE contacts for organometallic mimics of the metal ions. NMR is also useful for probing the binding of nucleic acid molecules to other molecules, such as proteins or drugs. This can be done by chemical-shift mapping, which is seeing which resonances are shifted upon binding of the other molecule, or by cross-saturation experiments where one of the binding molecules is selectively saturated and, if bound, the saturation transfers to the other molecule in the complex.

Dynamic properties such as duplex–single strand equilibria and binding rates of other molecules to duplexes can also be determined by its effect on the spin–lattice relaxation time T_{1}, but these methods are insensitive to intermediate rates of 10^{4}–10^{8} s^{−1}, which must be investigated with other methods such as solid-state NMR. Dynamics of mechanical properties of a nucleic acid double helix such as bending and twisting can also be studied using NMR. Pulsed field gradient NMR experiments can be used to measure diffusion constants.

== History ==
Nucleic acid NMR studies were performed as early as 1971, and focused on using the low-field imino proton resonances to probe base pairing interactions. These early studies focussed on tRNA because these nucleic acids were the only samples available at that time with low enough molecular weight that the NMR spectral line-widths were practical. The study focussed on the low-field protons because they were the only protons that could be reliably observed in aqueous solution using the best spectrometers available at that time. It was quickly realized that spectra of the low-field imino protons were providing clues to the tertiary structure of tRNA in solution. The first NMR spectrum of a double-helical DNA was published in 1977 using a synthetic, 30-base-pair double helix. To overcome sever line-broadening in native DNA, sheer-degraded natural DNA was prepared and studied to learn about the persistence length of double-helical DNA. At the same time, nucleosome core particles were studied to gain further insight of the flexibility of the double helix. The first NMR spectra reported for a uniform low molecular weight native-sequence DNA, made with restriction enzymes, was reported 1981. This work was also the first report of nucleic acid NMR spectra obtained at high field. Two dimensional NMR studies began to be reported in 1982 and then, with the advent of oligonucleotide synthesis and more sophisticated instrumentation, many detailed structural studies were reported starting in 1983.
