= Nuclear magnetic resonance crystallography =

Nuclear magnetic resonance crystallography (NMR crystallography) is a method which utilizes primarily NMR spectroscopy to determine the structure of solid materials on the atomic scale. Thus, solid-state NMR spectroscopy would be used primarily, possibly supplemented by quantum chemistry calculations (e.g. density functional theory), powder diffraction etc. If suitable crystals can be grown, any crystallographic method would generally be preferred to determine the crystal structure comprising in case of organic compounds the molecular structures and molecular packing. The main interest in NMR crystallography is in microcrystalline materials which are amenable to this method but not to X-ray, neutron and electron diffraction. This is largely because interactions of comparably short range are measured in NMR crystallography.

== Introduction ==
When applied to organic molecules, NMR crystallography aims at including structural information not only of a single molecule but also on the molecular packing (i.e. crystal structure). Contrary to X-ray, single crystals are not necessary with solid-state NMR and structural information can be obtained from high-resolution spectra of disordered solids. E.g. polymorphism is an area of interest for NMR crystallography since this is encountered occasionally (and may often be previously undiscovered) in organic compounds. In this case a change in the molecular structure and/or in the molecular packing can lead to polymorphism, and this can be investigated by NMR crystallography.

== Dipolar couplings-based approach ==
The spin interaction that is usually employed for structural analyses via solid state NMR spectroscopy is the magnetic dipolar interaction. Additional knowledge about other interactions within the studied system like the chemical shift or the electric quadrupole interaction can be helpful as well, and in some cases solely the chemical shift has been employed as e.g. for zeolites. The “dipole coupling”-based approach parallels protein NMR spectroscopy to some extent in that e.g. multiple residual dipolar couplings are measured for proteins in solution, and these couplings are used as constraints in the protein structure calculation.

In NMR crystallography the observed spins in case of organic molecules would often be spin-1/2 nuclei of moderate frequency (^{13}C, ^{15}N, ^{31}P, etc.). I.e. ^{1}H is excluded due to its large magnetogyric ratio and high spin concentration leading to a network of strong homonuclear dipolar couplings. There are two solutions with respect to ^{1}H: ^{1}H spin diffusion experiments (see below) and specific labelling with ^{2}H spins (spin = 1). The latter is also popular e.g. in NMR spectroscopic investigations of hydrogen bonds in solution and the solid state. Both intra- and intermolecular structural elements can be investigated e.g. via deuterium REDOR (an established solid state NMR pulse sequence to measure dipolar couplings between deuterons and other spins). This can provide an additional constraint for an NMR crystallographic structural investigation in that it can be used to find and characterize e.g. intermolecular hydrogen bonds.

=== Dipolar interaction ===
The above-mentioned dipolar interaction can be measured directly, e.g. between pairs of heteronuclear spins like ^{13}C/^{15}N in many organic compounds. Furthermore, the strength of the dipolar interaction modulates parameters like the longitudinal relaxation time or the spin diffusion rate which therefore can be examined to obtain structural information. E.g. ^{1}H spin diffusion has been measured providing rich structural information.

=== Chemical shift interaction ===
The chemical shift interaction can be used in conjunction with the dipolar interaction to determine the orientation of the dipolar interaction frame (principal axes system) with respect to the molecular frame (dipolar chemical shift spectroscopy). For some cases there are rules for the chemical shift interaction tensor orientation as for the ^{13}C spin in ketones due to symmetry arguments (sp^{2} hybridisation). If the orientation of a dipolar interaction (between the spin of interest and e.g. another heteronucleus) is measured with respect to the chemical shift interaction coordinate system, these two pieces of information (chemical shift tensor/molecular orientation and the dipole tensor/chemical shift tensor orientation) combined give the orientation of the dipole tensor in the molecular frame. However, this method is only suitable for small molecules (or polymers with a small repetition unit like polyglycine) and it provides only selective (and usually intramolecular) structural information.

== Crystal Structure Refinements ==
The dipolar interaction yields the most direct information with respect to structure as it makes it possible to measure the distances between the spins. The sensitivity of this interaction is however lacking and even though dipolar-based NMR crystallography makes the elucidation of structures possible, other methods are necessary to obtain high resolution structures. For these reasons much work was done to include the use other NMR observables such as chemical shift anisotropy, J-coupling and the quadrupolar interaction. These anisotropic interactions are highly sensitive to the 3D local environment making it possible to refine the structures of powdered samples to structures rivaling the quality of single crystal X-ray diffraction. These however rely on adequate methods for predicting these interactions as they do not depend in a straightforward fashion on the structure.

== Comparison with diffraction methods ==
A drawback of NMR crystallography is that the method is typically more time-consuming and more expensive (due to spectrometer costs and isotope labelling) than X-ray crystallography, it often elucidates only part of the structure, and isotope labelling and experiments may have to be tailored to obtain key structural information. Also a given molecular structure may not always be suitable for a pure NMR-based NMR crystallographic approach, but it can still play an important role in a multimodality (NMR+diffraction) study.

Unlike in the case of diffraction methods, it appears that NMR crystallography needs to work on a case-by-case basis. The reason is that different molecular systems will exhibit different spin physics and different observables which can be probed. The method may therefore not find widespread use as different systems will require tailored experimental designs to study them.
