= Groupement Ampère =

European magnetic resonance society

- Groupement AMPERE
- Abbreviation: AMPERE
- Formation: 1951
- Founder: René Freymann
- Type: Scientific society
- Headquarters: Zürich, Switzerland
- Field: Magnetic resonance

Groupement Ampère (also Groupement AMPERE or the Ampere Society) is a European scientific society devoted to magnetic resonance and related fields. Founded in France in 1951 and incorporated in Switzerland in 1956, it promotes research through conferences, schools, publications, and prizes. The society is particularly associated with the annual EUROMAR conference and with awards for early-career researchers in magnetic resonance.

== History ==
The society was founded in post-war France as an association of scientists working on radio-frequency spectroscopy and related subjects. Its abbreviation derives from the French phrase Atomes et Molécules Par Études Radio-Électriques (English: "Atoms and Molecules by Radio-Electrical Studies"). Alfred Kastler played an important role in its formation and in its European development in the 1950s and 1960s. Its original purpose was maintaining scientific communication across Europe, including communication between Western and Eastern European laboratories during the Cold War.

By the mid-1960s, Groupement Ampère had developed into an international association of magnetic-resonance specialists with members beyond France, including in Eastern Europe. During discussions on the structure of the European Physical Society, its organization served as a possible role model for balancing individual and institutional membership.

The society's historical motto, Se connaître, s'entendre, s'entraider ("to get to know each other, to listen to each other, to aid one another"), remained central to its self-perception today.

== Activities ==
Groupement Ampère's mission is to advance radio spectroscopy, magnetic resonance, and related phenomena through congresses, colloquia, symposia, schools, workshops, a society bulletin, and prizes. In addition to its meetings, the society publishes the Bulletin du Groupement AMPERE and is associated with the open-access journal Magnetic Resonance.

The society has both regular members and members associated with conference attendance; in 2017 it reported that membership income came in approximately equal parts from regular membership fees and conference attendance, with the regular-fee component corresponding to several hundred full-rate one-year memberships.

=== Conferences ===
The society's recurring events include the Ampere NMR School in Zakopane, the AMPERE Biological Solid-State NMR School, meetings associated with the European Federation of EPR groups, the Alpine Conference on Magnetic Resonance in Solids, conferences on hyperpolarized magnetic resonance, magnetic resonance in food science, magnetic resonance in porous media, and magnetic resonance microscopy.

The society's best-known conference activity is EUROMAR. EUROMAR was formed in 2005 through merging the Congress AMPERE, the British Radiofrequency Spectroscopy Group meeting, and the European Experimental NMR Conference. EUROMAR functions as the main annual meeting within the Ampere framework and serves as the venue for the principal prize sessions associated with the society and its conference network. The conference is held annually at different locations across Europe and covers magnetic resonance methods including NMR, EPR/ESR, and MRI and typically attracts 600-700 participants..

== Prizes and awards ==
Groupement Ampère directly administers two society prizes presented at EUROMAR: the Raymond Andrew Prize and the Ampere Prize for Young Investigators.

=== Raymond Andrew Prize ===
Named in honour of magnetic‑resonance pioneer Raymond Andrew, this prize is awarded annually to a young scientist for an outstanding PhD thesis in magnetic resonance. It is widely regarded as one of the highest honours for a PhD thesis in the field and distingushes theses that introduce fundamental advances or innovative methodologies that will shape the field. The prize is financed by a donation from the Andrew family. Winners present their work during the EUROMAR's main prize session, giving the selected thesis high visibility within the international magnetic-resonance community.

Raymond Andrew Prize laureates
- 2025: Nergiz Sahin Solmaz: Single Chip Dynamic Nuclear Polarization Microsystems
- 2024: Tamar Wolf: Enhancing the sensitivity and information content of challenging nuclei in solid state NMR
- 2023: Nino Wili: New electron spin resonance experiments with tailored waveform excitation
- 2022: Jacob R. Lindale: Understanding and Optimizing Dynamics in Hyperpolarized Magnetic Resonance
- 2021: Reid Alderson: Protein folding investigated by NMR spectroscopy
- 2020: Christian Bengs: Non-Equilibrium Nuclear Spin States
- 2019: Thach V. Can: New Methods for Dynamic Nuclear Polarization in Insulating Solids: The Overhauser Effect and Time Domain Techniques
- 2018: Giuliana Fusco: Structural Properties of α-Synuclein in Functional and Pathological Contexts
- 2017: Andrin Doll: Frequency-Swept Microwave Pulses for Electron Spin Resonance
- 2016: Frédéric A. Perras: Structural Insights from the NMR Spectroscopy of Quadrupolar Nuclei: Exploiting Electric Field Gradient and Spin-Spin Coupling Tensors
- 2015: Jean-Philippe Demers: From Slow to Ultra-fast MAS: Structural Determination of Type-Three Secretion System Bacterial Needles and Inorganic Materials by Solid-State NMR
- 2014: Oliver Duss: Assembly, 70 kDa solution structure and mechanism of action of the bacterial non-coding RNA RsmZ in complex with the global regulatory protein RsmE
- 2013: Michael C.D. Tayler: Theory and practice of singlet nuclear magnetic resonance
- 2012: Galia T. Debelouchina: Amyloid Fibril Structure of Peptides and Proteins by Magic Angle Spinning NMR Spectroscopy and Dynamic Nuclear Polarization
- 2011: Mark Hunter: Measurement and Simulation of the Nonlocal Dispersion Tensor in Porous Media
- 2010: Benjamin Wylie: Solid-State Magic Angle Spinning NMR Methods for Tensor Measurements and Protein Structure Refinement Using Chemical Shift Tensors
- 2009: Nils Lakomek: New Methods in NMR Spectroscopy for the Study of Protein Dynamics
- 2008: Boaz Shapira: Ultrafast two-dimensional NMR spectroscopy: development of a new tool for structural and dynamic analysis in the chemical and life science
- 2007: Christian Degen: Magnetic Resonance Force Microscopy: NMR Spectroscopy on the Micro- and Nanoscale
- 2006: Carlos Mattea: Molecular dynamics in porous media studied by Nuclear Magnetic Resonance Techniques
- 2005: Christian Beat Hilty: NMR Studies of the Membrane Protein OmpX in DHPC micelles
- 2004: Fabien Ferrage: Proton Spectroscopy in Heteronuclear NMR of Biomolecules. Single-Transition Cross Polarization and Heteronuclear Stimulated Echoes
- 2003: Elena Vinogradov: Protons in Solid State MAS NMR Spectroscopy
- 2002: Song-I Han: Correlation of Position and Motion by NMR: Pipe Flow, Falling Drop and Salt Water Ice

=== Ampere Prize for Young Investigators ===
The Ampere Prize for Young Investigators recognises early‑career researchers (typically within ten years of their PhD) for outstanding achievements in magnetic resonance. The prize is biannual and is financed by the Ampere Society. Up to 2016 it was sponsored by Bruker. The Ampere Prize signals that a researcher has already made influential contributions and is poised to become a leader in the field.

Ampere Prize for Young Investigators laureates
- 2025: Tuo Wang
- 2023: Ashok Ajoy
- 2021: Antoine Loquet
- 2020: Thomas Theis
- 2018: Katja Petzold
- 2016: Enrica Bordignon

== See also ==
- Magnetic resonance
- Nuclear magnetic resonance
- Electron paramagnetic resonance
