= Amorphous silica–alumina =

Amorphous silica–alumina is a synthetic substance that is used as a catalyst or catalyst support. It can be prepared in a number of ways for example:

- Precipitation of hydrous alumina onto amorphous silica hydrogel
- Reacting a silica sol with an alumina sol
- Coprecipitation from sodium silicate / aluminium salt solution

Water-soluble contaminants, e.g. sodium salts, are removed by washing.

Some of the alumina is present in tetrahedral coordination as shown by NMR studies ^{29}Si MASNMR and ^{27}Al NMR.

Amorphous silica–alumina contains sites which are termed Brønsted acid (or protic) sites, with an ionizable hydrogen atom, and Lewis acid (aprotic), electron accepting sites and these different types of acidic site can be distinguished by the ways in which, say, pyridine attaches. On Lewis acid sites it forms complexes and on the Brønsted sites it adsorbs as the pyridinium ion.

As of 2000 examples of processes that use silica–alumina catalysts are the production of pyridine from crotonaldehyde, formaldehyde, steam, air and ammonia and the cracking of hydrocarbons.

== Research ==
A 2021 study used double-flame-spray pyrolysis to prepare amorphous silica–aluminas with dispersed alumina domains on silica. The researchers varied the relative populations of Brønsted and Lewis acid sites while maintaining approximately uniform strength within each type of acid site. The materials were characterized using high-resolution transmission electron microscopy and solid-state nuclear magnetic resonance spectroscopy.

The catalysts were investigated for cyclohexanol dehydration to cyclohexene and for conversion of glucose to 5-hydroxymethylfurfural (HMF). In the latter reaction, Lewis acid sites promote glucose isomerization to fructose, followed by Brønsted-acid-catalyzed dehydration to HMF.
