= Bordignon =

Bordignon is an Italian surname. Notable people with the surname include:

- Arghus Soares Bordignon (born 1988), Brazilian football centre-back
- Claudio Bordignon, Italian hematologist
- Enrica Bordignon (born 1975), Italian chemist
- Noè Bordignon (1841–1920), Italian painter
- Fábio da Silva Bordignon (born 1992), Brazilian Paralympic athlete
- Giorgia Bordignon (born 1987), Italian weightlifter
- Laura Bordignon (born 1981), Italian discus thrower and shot putter

== See also ==
- Bourignon
