= Magic angle =

Angle between diagonal and edge of a cube

Magic angle

The magic angle is a precisely defined angle, the value of which is approximately 54.7356°. The magic angle is a root of a second-order Legendre polynomial, P_{2}(cos θ) = 0, and so any interaction which depends on this second-order Legendre polynomial vanishes at the magic angle. This property makes the magic angle of particular importance in magic-angle spinning solid-state NMR spectroscopy. In magnetic resonance imaging, structures with ordered collagen, such as tendons and ligaments, oriented at the magic angle may appear hyperintense in some sequences; this is called the magic angle artifact or effect.

== Mathematical definition ==
Using trigonometry

Using vector dot product

Calculating the double magic angle in a symmetrical tetrahedral molecule

The magic angle θ_{m} is

$$\theta_\mathrm{m} = \arccos \frac{1}{\sqrt{3}} = \arctan \sqrt{2} \approx 0.955\,32\ \text{rad} \approx 54.7^\circ \! ,$$

where arccos and arctan are the inverse cosine and tangent functions respectively. OEIS: A195696

θ_{m} is the angle between the space diagonal of a cube and any of its three connecting edges, see image.

Another representation of the magic angle is half of the opening angle formed when a cube is rotated from its space diagonal axis, which may be represented as arccos −1/3 or 2 arctan √2 radians ≈ 109.4712°. This double magic angle is directly related to tetrahedral molecular geometry and is the angle between two vertices and the exact center of a tetrahedron (i.e., the edge central angle also known as the tetrahedral angle).

== Magic angle and nuclear magnetic resonance ==
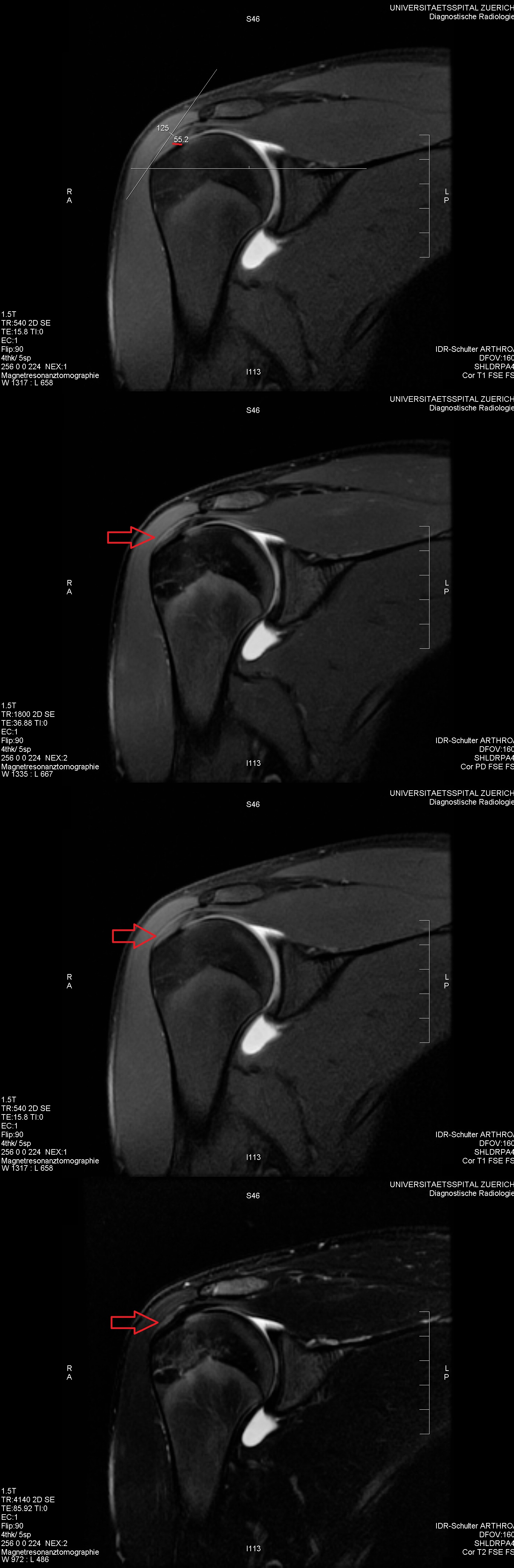
Magic angle effect seen on MRI of the shoulder

In nuclear magnetic resonance (NMR) spectroscopy, three prominent nuclear magnetic interactions, dipolar coupling, chemical shift anisotropy (CSA), and first-order quadrupolar coupling, depend on the orientation of the interaction tensor with the external magnetic field.

By spinning the sample around a given axis, their average angular dependence becomes:

$$\left\langle 3\cos^2\theta -1 \right\rangle =\left( 3\cos^2\theta_\mathrm{r} -1 \right)\left( 3\cos^2\beta -1 \right) \! ,$$

where θ is the angle between the principal axis of the interaction and the magnetic field, θ_{r} is the angle of the axis of rotation relative to the magnetic field and β is the (arbitrary) angle between the axis of rotation and principal axis of the interaction.

For dipolar couplings, the principal axis corresponds to the internuclear vector between the coupled spins; for the CSA, it corresponds to the direction with the largest deshielding; for the quadrupolar coupling, it corresponds to the z-axis of the electric-field gradient tensor.

The angle β cannot be manipulated as it depends on the orientation of the interaction relative to the molecular frame and on the orientation of the molecule relative to the external field. The angle θ_{r}, however, can be decided by the experimenter. If one sets θ_{r} = θ_{m} ≈ 54.7°, then the average angular dependence goes to zero. Magic-angle spinning is a technique in solid-state NMR spectroscopy which employs this principle to remove or reduce the influence of anisotropic interactions, thereby increasing spectral resolution.

For a time-independent interaction, i.e. heteronuclear dipolar couplings, CSA and first-order quadrupolar couplings, the anisotropic component is greatly reduced and almost suppressed in the limit of fast spinning, i.e. when the spinning frequency is greater than the width of the interaction.

The averaging is only close to zero in a first-order perturbation theory treatment; higher order terms cause allowed frequencies at multiples of the spinning frequency to appear, creating spinning side-bands in the spectra.

Time-dependent interactions, such as homonuclear dipolar couplings, are more difficult to average to their isotropic values by magic-angle spinning; a network of strongly coupled spins will produce a mixing of spin states during the course of the sample rotation, interfering with the averaging process.

== Application to medical imaging: The magic angle artifact ==
The magic angle artifact refers to the increased signal observed when MRI sequences with short echo time (TE) (e.g., T_{1} or proton density spin-echo sequences) are used to image tissues with well-ordered collagen fibers in one direction (e.g., tendon or articular hyaline cartilage). This artifact occurs when the angle such fibers make with the magnetic field is equal to θ_{m}.

Example: This artifact comes into play when evaluating the rotator cuff tendons of the shoulder. The magic angle effect can create the appearance of supraspinatus tendinitis.

== Reinforced rubber ==
To achieve optimal loading in a straight rubber hose the fibres must be positioned under an angle of approximately 54.7 angular degrees, also referred to as the magic angle. The magic angle of 54.7 exactly balances the internal-pressure-induced longitudinal stress and the hoop (circumferential) stress.
