= Residual chemical shift anisotropy =

Residual chemical shift anisotropy (RCSA) is the difference between the chemical shift anisotropy (CSA) of aligned and non-aligned molecules. It is normally three orders of magnitude smaller than the static CSA, with values on the order of parts-per-billion (ppb). RCSA is useful for structural determination and it is among the new developments in NMR spectroscopy.

== See also ==
- Residual dipolar coupling
