= Mark Hunter =

Mark Hunter may refer to:

- Sir Mark Hunter (civil servant) (1865–1932), schoolmaster in India
- Mark Hunter (politician) (born 1957), British politician
- Mark Hunter (ice hockey) (born 1962), retired NHL ice hockey player
- Mark Hunter (footballer) (born 1965), former Australian rules footballer with Footscray
- Mark C. Hunter (born 1974), Canadian naval historian
- Mark Hunter (musician) (born 1977), singer for American heavy metal band Chimaira
- Mark Hunter (rower) (born 1978), Olympic gold medalist rower and Leander Club member
- Mark Hunter (keyboard player), keyboard player associated with Manchester band James
- Mark Hunter (podcaster), Scottish podcaster behind The Mellow Monday Show and the Tartan Podcast
- Mark Hunter (photographer), American photographer

== See also ==
- Marc Hunter (1953–1998), rock and pop singer
- Marc Hunter (athlete) (born 1956), American athlete
