= Zero-field splitting =

Quantum mechanical spectroscopic effect

In quantum mechanics, zero-field splitting (ZFS) describes the splitting of energy levels in systems with multiple unpaired electrons (i.e. systems with total spin quantum number $S>1/2$) in the absence of an applied magnetic field. Examples of such systems include organic radicals, transition metal complexes and point defects in crystals. ZFS arises from dipolar spin–spin interactions and spin–orbit coupling and can be measured experimentally via electron spin resonance spectroscopy. Theoretical predictions of ZFS parameters can be calculated using quantum chemical ab initio and density functional theory approaches.

The simplest example of ZFS is the spin triplet (i.e. $S=1$) system. In the presence of a strong magnetic field, the Zeeman interaction dominates the spin Hamiltonian and the spin eigenstates are well described by the magnetic spin quantum number $(m_S = 0, \pm 1)$. In the absence of magnetic field, $m_S$ ceases to be a good quantum number. Instead, the system is described by the eigenstates $\left\lbrace T_x,T_y,T_z\right\rbrace$ – the states with zero spin projection along the respective Cartesian axes. The relative energies of these are determined by the ZFS interaction strengths.

For half-integer spin systems, ZFS splits the states into pairs of Kramers doublets $(m_S=\pm1/2,\pm3/2,\dots)$ with degeneracies protected by their time-reversal symmetry.

== Quantum-mechanical description ==
The corresponding Hamiltonian can be written as

$$\hat{\mathcal{H}} = D\left(S_z^2 - \frac{1}{3}S(S + 1)\right) + E(S_x^2 - S_y^2),$$

where S is the total spin quantum number, and $S_{x,y,z}$ are the spin matrices.

The value of the ZFS parameter are usually defined via D and E parameters. D describes the axial component of the magnetic dipole–dipole interaction, and E the transversal component. Values of D have been obtained for a wide number of organic biradicals by EPR measurements. This value may be measured by other magnetometry techniques such as SQUID; however, EPR measurements provide more accurate data in most cases. This value can also be obtained with other techniques such as optically detected magnetic resonance (ODMR; a double-resonance technique which combines EPR with measurements such as fluorescence, phosphorescence and absorption), with sensitivity down to a single molecule or defect in solids like diamond (e.g. N-V center) or silicon carbide.

=== Algebraic derivation ===
The start is the corresponding Hamiltonian $\hat{\mathcal{H}}_D = \mathbf{SDS}$. $\mathbf{D}$ describes the dipolar spin–spin interaction between two unpaired spins ($S_1$ and $S_2$). Where $S = S_1 + S_2$ is the total spin, and

$$\mathbf{D} = \begin{pmatrix} D_{xx} &  0    & 0   \\ 0   &  D_{yy}  & 0   \\ 0   &  0    & D_{zz} \end{pmatrix}$$	1

is a symmetric and traceless ($D_{xx} + D_{yy} + D_{zz} = 0$, when is arises from dipole–dipole interaction) matrix, which means that it is diagonalizable.

With $D_{jj}$ denoted as $D_j$ for simplicity, the Hamiltonian becomes

$\hat{\mathcal{H}}_D = D_x S_x^2 + D_y S_y^2 + D_z S_z^2$	2

The key is to express $D_x S_x^2 + D_y S_y^2$ as its mean value and a deviation $\Delta$,

$D_x S_x^2 + D_y S_y^2 = \frac{D_x + D_y}{2} (S_x^2 + S_y^2) + \Delta,$	3

to find the value for the deviation $\Delta$, which is then by rearranging equation (3)

$$\begin{align} \Delta &= \frac{D_x - D_y}{2} S_x^2 + \frac{D_y - D_x}{2} S_y^2 \\ &= \frac{D_x - D_y}{2} (S_x^2 - S_y^2). \end{align}$$	4

Inserting (4) and (3) into (2) yields

$$\begin{align} \hat{\mathcal{H}}_D &= \frac{D_x + D_y}{2} (S_x^2 + S_y^2) + \frac{D_x - D_y}{2} (S_x^2 - S_y^2) + D_zS_z^2 \\ &= \frac{D_x + D_y}{2} (S_x^2 + S_y^2 + S_z^2 - S_z^2) + \frac{D_x - D_y}{2} (S_x^2 - S_y^2) + D_z S_z^2. \end{align}$$	5

Note that $S_z^2 - S_z^2$ was added in the second line in (5). By doing so, $S_x^2 + S_y^2 + S_z^2 = S(S + 1)$ can be further used.

By using the fact that $\mathbf{D}$ is traceless ($\tfrac{1}{2} D_x + \tfrac{1}{2} D_y = -\tfrac{1}{2} D_z$), equation (5) simplifies to

$$\begin{align} \hat{\mathcal{H}}_D &= -\frac{D_z}{2} S(S + 1) + \frac{1}{2} D_z S_z^2 + \frac{D_x - D_y}{2} (S_x^2 - S_y^2) + D_z S_z^2 \\ &= -\frac{D_z}{2} S(S + 1) + \frac{3}{2} D_z S_z^2 + \frac{D_x - D_y}{2} (S_x^2 - S_y^2) \\ &= \frac{3}{2} D_z \left(S_z^2 - \frac{S(S + 1)}{3}\right) + \frac{D_x - D_y}{2} (S_x^2 - S_y^2). \end{align}$$	6

By defining D and E parameters, equation (6) becomes

$\hat{\mathcal{H}}_D = D \left(S_z^2 - \frac{1}{3} S(S + 1)\right) + E(S_x^2 - S_y^2)$	7

with $D = \tfrac{3}{2} D_z$ and $E = \tfrac{1}{2} (D_x - D_y)$ – the measurable zero-field splitting values.
