= Enrica Bordignon =

Italian chemist

- Born: 5 April 1975 (age 51)
- Education: University of Padua
- Scientific career
- Workplaces: Ruhr University Bochum; Free University of Berlin; Osnabrück University; ETH Zurich; University of Geneva
- Thesis: (2000)

Enrica Bordignon (born 5 April 1975) is an Italian chemist and Chair of Electron Spin Resonance at the University of Geneva. Her research involves the development of electron paramagnetic resonance to study membrane potentials.

== Early life and education ==
Bordignon was an undergraduate student and doctoral researcher at the University of Padua. Her doctoral research investigated the photo-physical properties of reaction centres in antenna complexes. During her doctorate, she worked at Berlin's Max Volmer Laboratory. She completed her undergraduate studies summa cum laude in 1999. She was a postdoctoral researcher at the Osnabrück University and ETH Zurich. At Osnabrück Bordignon studied bacterial photoaxis membrane protein complexes (including Neuropeptide S receptors) and ABC-transporters (including Escherichia coli) using spin labelling. At Zurich Bordignon continued to apply spin labelling to investigate the ATP-binding cassette transporters, including BtuCD-F vitamin B12 importer.

== Research and career ==
In 2013 Bordignon was made a professor of biophysics at the Free University of Berlin. Her research uses site-directed spin labelling EPR to understand the dynamics and conformational changes of membrane proteins. Membrane proteins are the targets of many pharmaceuticals. Transporter membranes move substances in and out of the cellular environment. Bordignon has shown that EPR can be used to study membrane potentials in situ, i.e. in cells. She has particularly developed double electron–electron resonance (DEER), which can be used to monitor one system of spins while exciting another set of spins at a second microwave frequency. She was the first to use spin-labelled nanobodies to report cellular membrane potentials. She moved to the Ruhr University Bochum in 2016. She was appointed Professor of Chemistry at the University of Geneva in 2021, and made Vice Dean for Science in 2023.

== Awards and honours ==
- 2004 Alexander von Humboldt Postdoctoral Research Fellowship
- 2011 IES Young Investigator Award
- 2016 Ampere Prize for Young Investigator

== Select publications ==
- Yevhen Polyhach; Enrica Bordignon; Gunnar Jeschke (30 November 2010). "Rotamer libraries of spin labelled cysteines for protein studies". Physical Chemistry Chemical Physics. 13 (6): 2356–2366. doi:10.1039/c0cp01865a. ISSN 1463-9076. PMID 21116569. Wikidata Q33758312.
- Stephanie Bleicken; Gunnar Jeschke; Carolin Stegmueller; Raquel Salvador-Gallego; Ana J García-Sáez; Enrica Bordignon (30 October 2014). "Structural model of active Bax at the membrane". Molecular Cell. 56 (4): 496–505. doi:10.1016/j.molcel.2014.09.022. ISSN 1097-2765. PMC 4869853. PMID 25458844. Wikidata Q42166522.
- Euripedes de Almeida Ribeiro; Nikos Pinotsis; Andrea Ghisleni; et al. (4 December 2014). "The structure and regulation of human muscle α-actinin". Cell. 159 (6): 1447–60. doi:10.1016/j.cell.2014.10.056. ISSN 0092-8674. PMC 4259493. PMID 25433700. Wikidata Q24307560.

== Personal life ==
Bordignon has one child.
