= Spin diffusion =

Type of energy exchange

Spin diffusion describes a situation wherein the individual nuclear spins undergo continuous exchange of energy. This permits polarization differences within the sample to be reduced on a timescale much shorter than relaxation effects.

Spin diffusion is a process by which magnetization can be exchanged spontaneously between spins. The process is driven by dipolar coupling, and is therefore related to internuclear distances. Spin diffusion has been used to study many structural problems in the past, ranging from domain sizes in polymers and disorder in glassy materials to high-resolution crystal structure determination of small molecules and proteins.

In solid-state nuclear magnetic resonance, spin diffusion plays a major role in Cross Polarization (CP) experiments. As mentioned before, by transferring the magnetization (and thus the population) from nuclei with different values for the spin-lattice relaxation (T_{1}), the overall time for the experiment is reduced. Is a very common practice when the sample contains hydrogen. Another desirable effect is that the signal to noise ratio (S/N) is increased until a theoretical factor γ_{A}/γ_{B}, being γ the gyromagnetic ratio.
