= Exclusive correlation spectroscopy =

NMR correlation experiment

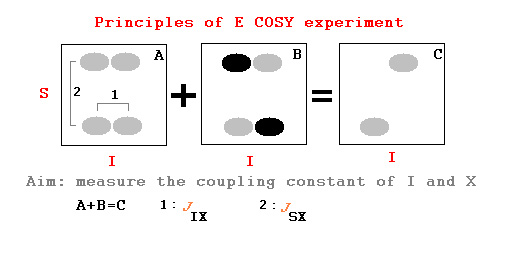
E COSY experiment: A and B are the two parts of the detected signal.

Exclusive correlation spectroscopy (ECOSY) is an NMR correlation experiment introduced by O. W. Sørensen, Christian Griesinger, Richard R. Ernst and coworkers for the accurate measurement of small J-couplings.

The idea behind the experiment is to measure an unresolved coupling with the help of a larger coupling which is resolved in a dimension orthogonal to the small coupling. Three active nuclei are needed (SXI spin system) and the pulse sequence must be able to transfer magnetization from I to S without changing the spin state of X, otherwise the ECOSY pattern will vanish.

ECOSY experiment is often used to determine the relative signs of J-couplings and to distinguish between the active coupling (the one responsible for the cross-peak) and the passive couplings caused by observer spins.

250 MHz ECOSY NMR spectrum of strychnine alkaloid simulated using Spinach.
