= Raymond Andrew =

Physicist

Raymond Andrew FRS FRSE
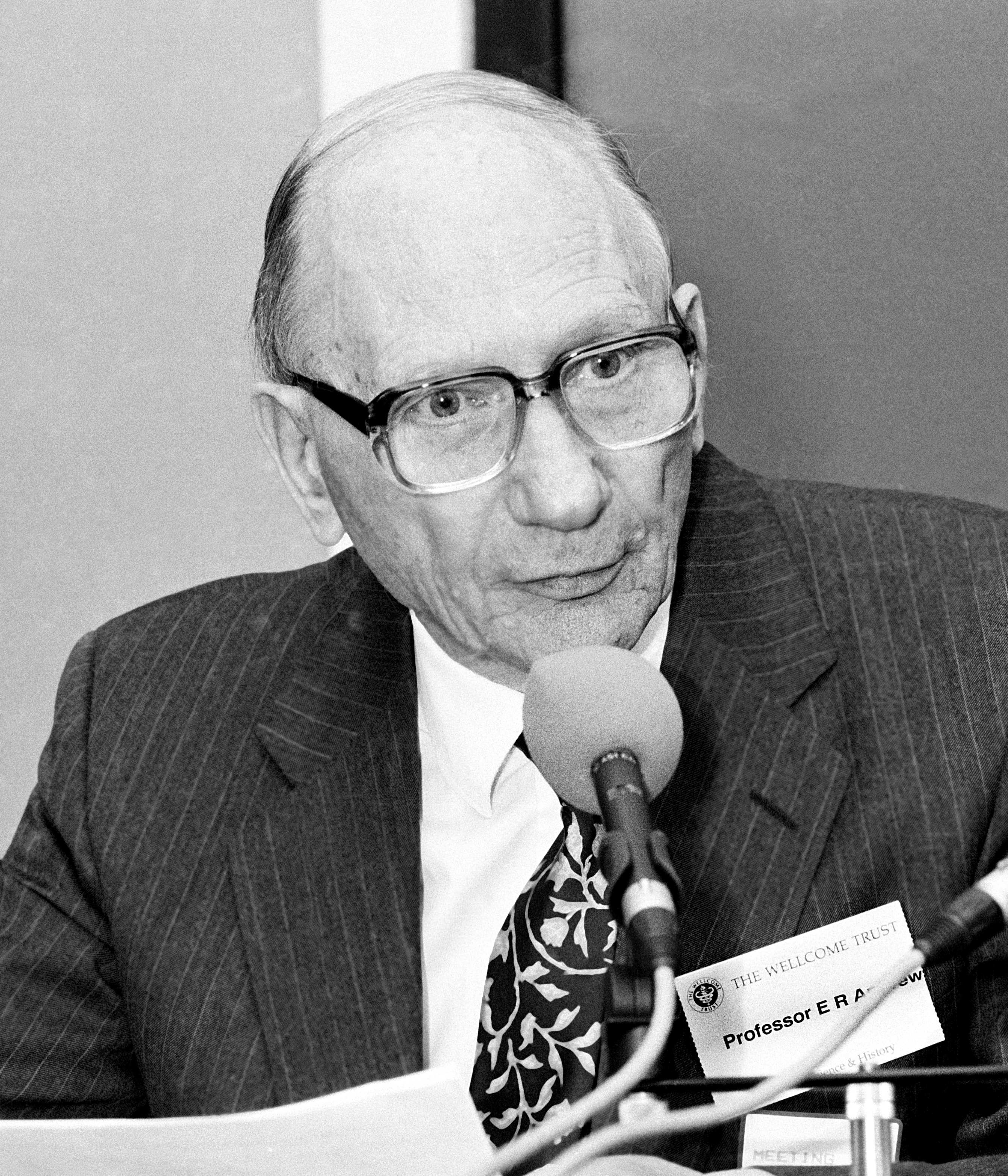
- Andrew in 1996
- Born: 27 June 1921; Boston, Lincolnshire, UK
- Died: 27 May 2001 (aged 79)
- Education: Christ's College, Cambridge; Pembroke College
- Known for: MRI scanner
- Scientific career
- Workplaces: Cavendish Laboratory; University of North Wales; University of Nottingham; University of Florida

Edward Raymond Andrew (27 June 1921 – 27 May 2001) was a 20th-century British scientist who was a pioneer of nuclear magnetic resonance. He was a primary figure in the development and creation of the world's first MRI scanner.

== Life ==
He was born in Boston, Lincolnshire, on 27 June 1921 the only child of English parents of Scots descent. He was educated at Wellingborough School where he was head boy. He then won a place at Christ's College, Cambridge on a Natural Science Tripos from 1939 to 1942 under C. P. Snow, Lawrence Bragg, Norman Feather, and David Shoenberg.

From 1942 to 1945, during the Second World War, he was a Scientific Officer at the Air Defence Research and Development Establishment in Malvern studying the effects of gun flashes on radar.

In 1945 he returned to Cambridge as a research student at Pembroke College and the Cavendish Laboratory. Here he worked with David Shoenberg on superconductors, gaining a doctorate (PhD) in 1948. He then went to Harvard University for a year to work on nuclear magnetic resonance with Ed Purcell and Bersohn, also working on the Pake doublet.

He returned to Britain in 1949 to work with Jack Allen FRS at the Cavendish. Colleagues on the NMR project included Bob Eades, Dan Hyndman, and Alwyn Rushworth. His students here included Waldo Hinshaw.

In March 1952, he was elected a Fellow of the Royal Society of Edinburgh.

In 1954, he became a professor and head of physics at the University of North Wales in Bangor. Here he founded the British Radio-Frequency Spectroscopy Group (BRSG).

In 1964, he moved to a chair at the University of Nottingham in place of Prof L. F. Bates. His work here included the development of the MRI scanner from 1975 to 1977. In 1978, their success led to the development of the whole-body MRI scanner.

After 19 years in Nottingham, he moved to the University of Florida in Gainesville as a Graduate Professor of Radiology, Physics, and Nuclear Engineering.

In 1984, he was elected a Fellow of the Royal Society of London, and won their Wellcome Medal in the same year.

He died on 27 May 2001, aged 79.

== Family ==
He was married twice: firstly to Mary with whom he had two daughters (Patricia and Charmian); and secondly in 1972 to Eunice.

== Publications ==
- Magnetic Resonance in Medicine (1984)
