= Pake doublet =

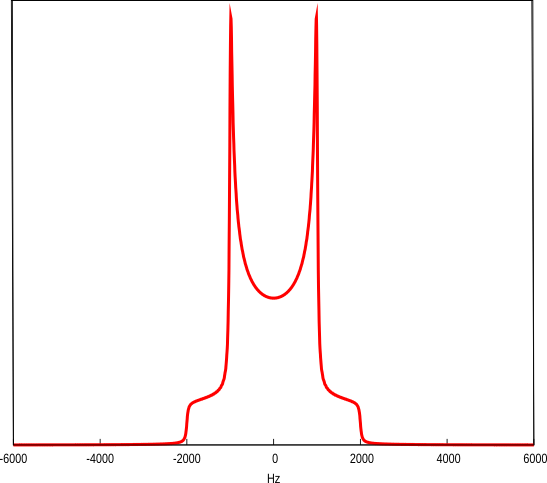
Simulated pake doublet.

A Pake Doublet (or "Pake Pattern") is a characteristic line shape seen in solid-state nuclear magnetic resonance and electron paramagnetic resonance spectroscopy. It was first described by George Pake.

It arises from dipolar coupling between isolated two spin-1/2 nuclei, or from transitions in quadrupolar nuclei such as deuterium. It is the general shape obtained from an orientationally dependent doublet. The "horns" of the Pake doublet correspond to the situation when the principal axis of the coupling interaction (the internuclear vector in the case dipolar coupling and the principal component of the electric field gradient tensor for quadrupolar nuclei) is perpendicular to the magnetic field. This situation is the most probable and the intensity is much higher. The "feet" of the lineshape correspond to the situation when the principal axis of the coupling interaction is parallel to the magnetic field which is much less statistically relevant.

Pake was the first to describe this lineshape and used it to extract the proton-proton distance from his experiments on a single crystal and powdered hydrates of gypsum (CaSO_{4}.2H_{2}O). This made it possible to experimentally determine the internuclear distance between the hydrogen atoms in water.

In solids with vacant positions, dipole coupling is averaged partially due to water diffusion which proceeds according to the symmetry of the solids and the probability distribution of molecules between the vacancies. In the case the averaged lineshape is used to analyze crystal symmetry, phase transitions, and the degree of molecular disorder in crystalline hydrates, zeolites, clays and biological tissues.
