= Magic angle spinning =

Technique in solid-state NMR spectroscopy

Magic-angle spinning: The sample (blue) is rotating with high frequency inside the main magnetic field (B_{0}). The axis of rotation is tilted by the magic angle θ_{m} with respect to the direction of B_{0}.

In solid-state NMR spectroscopy, magic-angle spinning (MAS) is a technique routinely used to produce better resolution NMR spectra. MAS NMR consists in spinning the sample (usually at a frequency of 1 to 130 kHz) at the magic angle θ_{m} (ca. 54.74°, where cos^{2}θ_{m}=1/3) with respect to the direction of the magnetic field.

Three main interactions responsible in solid state NMR (dipolar, chemical shift anisotropy, quadrupolar) often lead to very broad and featureless NMR lines. However, these three interactions in solids are orientation-dependent and can be averaged to some extent by MAS:

- The nuclear dipolar interaction has a $3\cos^2\theta - 1$ dependence, where $\theta$ is the angle between the internuclear axis and the main magnetic field. As a result, the dipolar interaction vanish at the magic angle θ_{m} and the interaction contributing to the line broadening is removed. Even though all internuclear vectors cannot be all set to the magic angle, rotating the sample around this axis produces the same effect, provided the frequency is comparable to that of the interaction. In addition, a set of spinning sidebands appear on the spectra, which are sharp lines separated from the isotropic resonance frequency by a multiple of the spinning rate.
- The chemical shift anisotropy (CSA) represents the orientation-dependence of the chemical shift. Powder patterns generated by the CSA interaction can be averaged by MAS, resulting to one single resonance centred at the isotropic chemical shift (centre of mass of the powder pattern).
- The quadrupolar interaction is only partially averaged by MAS leaving a residual secondary quadrupolar interaction.

In solution-state NMR, most of these interactions are averaged out because of the rapid time-averaged molecular motion that occurs due to the thermal energy (molecular tumbling).

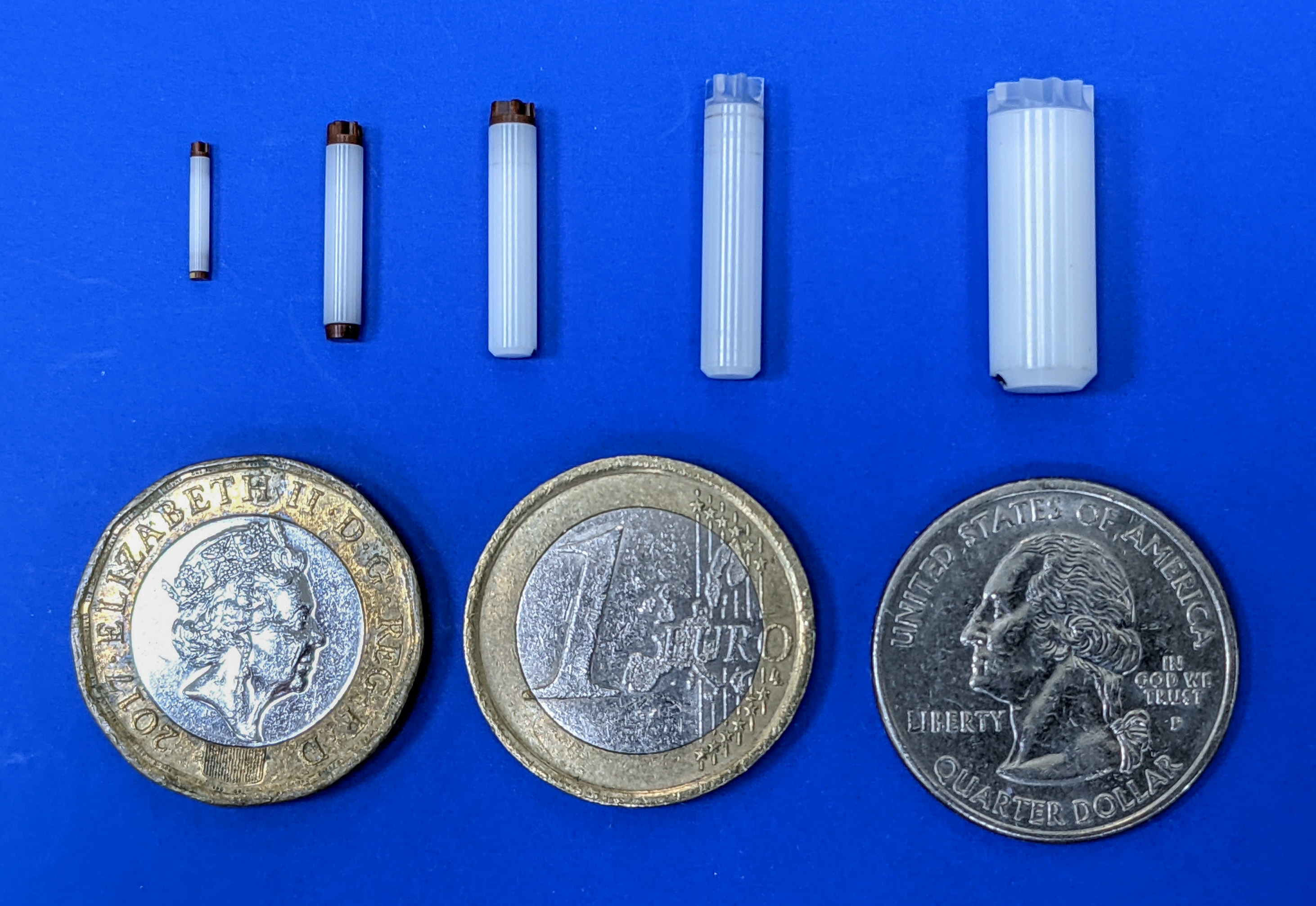
Bruker MAS rotors. From left to right: 1.3 mm (up to 67 kHz), 2.5 mm (up to 35 kHz), 3.2 mm (up to 24 kHz), 4 mm (up to 15 kHz), 7 mm (up to 7 kHz)

The spinning of the sample is achieved via an impulse air turbine mechanism, where the sample tube is lifted with a frictionless compressed gas bearing and spun with a gas drive. Sample tubes are hollow cylinders coming in a variety of outer diameters ranging from 0.70 to 7 mm, mounted with a turbine cap. The rotors are typically made from zirconium oxide, although other ceramic materials (silicon nitride) or polymers (poly(methyl methacrylate) (PMMA), polyoxymethylene (POM)) can be found. Removable caps close the ends of the sample tube. They are made from a range of materials typically Kel-F, Vespel, or zirconia and boron nitride for an extended temperature range.

Magic-angle spinning was first described in 1958 by Edward Raymond Andrew, A. Bradbury, and R. G. Eades and independently in 1959 by I. J. Lowe. The name "magic-angle spinning" was coined in 1960 by Cornelis J. Gorter at the AMPERE congress in Pisa.

== Variations ==
=== High Resolution Magic-Angle Spinning (HR-MAS) ===
HRMAS is usually applied to solutions and gels where dipole-dipole interactions are insufficiently averaged by the intermediate molecular motion. HRMAS can dramatically average out residual dipolar interactions and result in spectra with linewidths similar to solution-state NMR. HRMAS links the gap between solution-state and solid-state NMR, and enable the use of solution-state experiments

HRMAS and its medical research application was first described in a 1997 study of human brain tissues from a neurodegenerative disorder.

=== Solution Magic Angle Spinning ===
Use of Magic Angle Spinning has been extended from solid-state to liquid (solution) NMR.

=== Magic angle turning ===
The magic-angle-turning (MAT) technique introduced by Gan employs slow (approximately 30 Hz) rotation of a powdered sample at the magic angle, in concert with pulses synchronized to 1/3 of the rotor period, to obtain isotropic-shift information in one dimension of a 2D spectrum.

=== Magic angle spinning spheres ===
Rather than using cylindrical rotors, spinning spheres can be spun stably at the magic angle, which can be used to increase the filling factor of the coils, hence improve the sensitivity. Magic angle spinning spheres allow stable MAS with faster spinning rates.

== Applications ==
There are significant advantages to using MAS NMR in structural biology. Magic angle spinning can be used to characterize large insoluble systems, including biological assemblies and intact viruses, that cannot be studied with other methods.
