= Karplus equation =

Correlation used in NMR spectroscopy

Graph of the Karplus relation J_{HH}(φ) = 12 cos^{^2}φ - cosφ+2 obtained for ethane derivatives

The Karplus equation, named after Martin Karplus, describes the correlation between ^{3}J-coupling constants and dihedral torsion angles in nuclear magnetic resonance spectroscopy:

$$J(\phi) = A \cos\,2\phi + B \cos\,\phi + C$$

where J is the ^{3}J coupling constant, $\phi$ is the dihedral angle, and A, B, and C are empirically derived parameters whose values depend on the atoms and substituents involved. The relationship may be expressed in a variety of equivalent ways e.g. involving cos 2φ rather than cos^{2} φ —these lead to different numerical values of A, B, and C but do not change the nature of the relationship.

The relationship is used for ^{3}J_{H,H} coupling constants. The superscript "3" indicates that a ^{1}H atom is coupled to another ^{1}H atom three bonds away, via H-C-C-H bonds. (Such H atoms bonded to neighbouring carbon atoms are termed vicinal). The magnitude of these couplings are generally smallest when the torsion angle is close to 90° and largest at angles of 0 and 180°.

This relationship between local geometry and coupling constant is of great value throughout nuclear magnetic resonance spectroscopy and is particularly valuable for determining backbone torsion angles in protein NMR studies.
