= Mark Hunter (podcaster) =

Mark Hunter is a Scottish-based podcaster. He started the tartanpodcast in March 2005 quickly following it with the "Sleepy Sunday Show" and "The Spotlight Show". The tartanpodcast was the first music-based podcast from Scotland.

The summer of 2006 saw him start "The Mellow Monday Show".

Production of the tartanpodcast, a showcase music podcast for Scottish indie bands, ended in June 2007 after 110 episodes. Following a one-off episode in October, the tartanpodcast returned as a regular show in February 2008.

Mark tried to keep a down to earth production standard for the tartanpodcast, referring to himself as just a guy, living and working in Glasgow, Scotland.

An article on the BBC Technology site from June 5, 2005, raised the profile of the tartan podcast. Several podcasters have since attributed their decision to start their own podcast to reading this article.

Mark was approached late in December 2007 and asked to become managing director of new media production company Podcastmatters Ltd.

In 2009 Mark set up a new company Postable and undertook the role of Social Media Manager at a tool retailer called Toolstop.
