= J-coupling =

Type of coupling used in NMR spectroscopy

In nuclear chemistry and nuclear physics, J-couplings (also called spin-spin coupling or indirect dipole–dipole coupling) are mediated through chemical bonds connecting two spins. It is an indirect interaction between two nuclear spins that arises from hyperfine interactions between the nuclei and local electrons. In NMR spectroscopy, J-coupling contains information about relative bond distances and angles. Most importantly, J-coupling provides information on the connectivity of chemical bonds. It is responsible for the often complex splitting of resonance lines in the NMR spectra of fairly simple molecules.

J-coupling is a frequency difference that is not affected by the strength of the magnetic field, so is always stated in Hz.

== Vector model and manifestations for chemical structure assignments ==
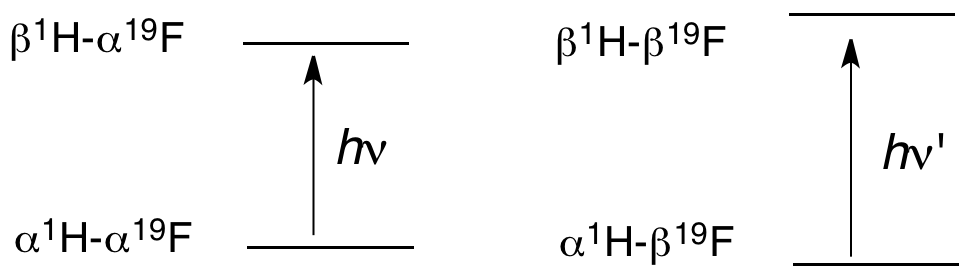
Energy diagram showing the effects of J-coupling for the molecule hydrogen fluoride

The origin of J-coupling can be visualized by a vector model for a simple molecule such as hydrogen fluoride (HF). In HF, the two nuclei have spin 1/2. Four states are possible, depending on the relative alignment of the H and F nuclear spins with the external magnetic field. The selection rules of NMR spectroscopy dictate that ΔI = 1, which means that a given photon (in the radio frequency range) can affect ("flip") only one of the two nuclear spins. J-coupling provides three parameters: the multiplicity (the "number of lines"), the magnitude of the coupling (strong, medium, weak), and the sign of the coupling.

=== Multiplicity ===
Example ^{1}H NMR spectrum (1-dimensional) of ethanol plotted as signal intensity vs. chemical shift. There are three different types of H atoms in ethanol regarding NMR. The hydrogen (H) on the −OH group is not coupling with the other H atoms and appears as a singlet, but the CH_{3}− and the −CH_{2}− hydrogens are coupling with each other, resulting in a triplet and quartet respectively.

The multiplicity provides information on the number of centers coupled to the signal of interest, and their nuclear spin. For simple systems, as in ^{1}H–^{1}H coupling in NMR spectroscopy, the multiplicity is one more than the number of adjacent protons which are magnetically nonequivalent to the protons of interest. For ethanol, each methyl proton is coupled to the two methylene protons, so the methyl signal is a triplet, while each methylene proton is coupled to the three methyl protons, so the methylene signal is a quartet.

Nuclei with spins greater than 1/2, which are called quadrupolar, can give rise to greater splitting, although in many cases coupling to quadrupolar nuclei is not observed. Many elements consist of nuclei with nuclear spin and without. In these cases, the observed spectrum is the sum of spectra for each isotopomer. One of the great conveniences of NMR spectroscopy for organic molecules is that several important lighter spin 1/2 nuclei are either monoisotopic, e.g. ^{31}P and ^{19}F, or have very high natural abundance, e.g. ^{1}H. An additional convenience is that ^{12}C and ^{16}O have no nuclear spin so these nuclei, which are common in organic molecules, do not cause splitting patterns in NMR.

=== Magnitude of J-coupling ===
For ^{1}H–^{1}H coupling, the magnitude of J decreases rapidly with the number of bonds between the coupled nuclei, especially in saturated molecules. Generally speaking two-bond coupling (i.e. ^{1}H–C–^{1}H) is stronger than three-bond coupling (^{1}H–C–C–^{1}H). The magnitude of the coupling also provides information on the dihedral angles relating the coupling partners, as described by the Karplus equation for three-bond coupling constants.

For heteronuclear coupling, the magnitude of J is related to the nuclear magnetic moments of the coupling partners. ^{19}F, with a high nuclear magnetic moment, gives rise to large coupling to protons. ^{103}Rh, with a very small nuclear magnetic moment, gives only small couplings to ^{1}H. To correct for the effect of the nuclear magnetic moment (or equivalently the gyromagnetic ratio γ), the "reduced coupling constant" K is often discussed, where

K = 4π^{2}J/hγ_{x}γ_{y}.

For coupling of a ^{13}C nucleus and a directly bonded proton, the dominant term in the coupling constant J_{C–H} is the Fermi contact interaction, which is a measure of the s-character of the bond at the two nuclei.

Where the external magnetic field is very low, e.g. as Earth's field NMR, J-coupling signals of the order of hertz usually dominate chemical shifts which are of the order of millihertz and are not normally resolvable.

=== Sign of J-coupling ===
The value of each coupling constant also has a sign, and coupling constants of comparable magnitude often have opposite signs. If the coupling constant between two given spins is negative, the energy is lower when these two spins are parallel, and conversely if their coupling constant is positive. For a molecule with a single J-coupling constant, the appearance of the NMR spectrum is unchanged if the sign of the coupling constant is reversed, although spectral lines at given positions may represent different transitions. The simple NMR spectrum therefore does not indicate the sign of the coupling constant, which there is no simple way of predicting.

However for some molecules with two distinct J-coupling constants, the relative signs of the two constants can be experimentally determined by a double resonance experiment. For example in the diethylthallium ion (C_{2}H_{5})_{2}Tl^{+}, this method showed that the methyl-thallium (CH_{3}-Tl) and methylene-thallium (CH_{2}-Tl) coupling constants have opposite signs.

The first experimental method to determine the absolute sign of a J-coupling constant was proposed in 1962 by Buckingham and Lovering, who suggested the use of a strong electric field to align the molecules of a polar liquid. The field produces a direct dipolar coupling of the two spins, which adds to the observed J-coupling if their signs are parallel and subtracts from the observed J-coupling if their signs are opposed. This method was first applied to 4-nitrotoluene, for which the J-coupling constant between two adjacent (or ortho) ring protons was shown to be positive because the splitting of the two peaks for each proton decreases with the applied electric field.

Another way to align molecules for NMR spectroscopy is to dissolve them in a nematic liquid crystal solvent. This method has also been used to determine the absolute sign of J-coupling constants.

== J-coupling Hamiltonian ==
The Hamiltonian of a molecular system may be taken as:

H = D_{1} + D_{2} + D_{3},

- D_{1} = electron orbital–orbital, spin–orbital, spin–spin and electron-spin–external-field interactions
- D_{2} = magnetic interactions between nuclear spin and electron spin
- D_{3} = direct interaction of nuclei with each other

For a singlet molecular state and frequent molecular collisions, D_{1} and D_{3} are almost zero. The full form of the J-coupling interaction between spins 'I_{j} and I_{k} on the same molecule is:

H = 2π I_{j} · J_{jk} · I_{k}

where J_{jk} is the J-coupling tensor, a real 3 × 3 matrix. It depends on molecular orientation, but in an isotropic liquid it reduces to a number, the so-called scalar coupling. In 1D NMR, the scalar coupling leads to oscillations in the free induction decay as well as splittings of lines in the spectrum.

== Decoupling ==
By selective radio frequency irradiation, NMR spectra can be fully or partially decoupled, eliminating or selectively reducing the coupling effect. Carbon-13 NMR spectra are often recorded with proton decoupling.

== History ==
In September 1951, H. S. Gutowsky, D. W. McCall, and C. P. Slichter reported experiments on $\ce{HPF_6}$, $\ce{CH_3OPF_2}$, and $\ce{POCl_2F}$, where they explained the presence of multiple resonance lines with an interaction of the form $A \mathbf{\mu}_1\cdot\mathbf{\mu}_2$.

Independently, in October 1951, E. L. Hahn and D. E. Maxwell reported a spin echo experiment which indicates the existence of an interaction between two protons in dichloroacetaldehyde. In the echo experiment, two short, intense pulses of radiofrequency magnetic field are applied to the spin ensemble at the nuclear resonance condition and are separated by a time interval of τ. The echo appears with a given amplitude at time 2τ. For each setting of τ, the maximum value of the echo signal is measured and plotted as a function of τ. If the spin ensemble consists of a magnetic moment, a monotonic decay in the echo envelope is obtained. In the Hahn–Maxwell experiment, the decay was modulated by two frequencies: one frequency corresponded with the difference in chemical shift between the two non-equivalent spins and a second frequency, J, that was smaller and independent of magnetic field strength (J/2π = 0.7 Hz). Such interaction came as a great surprise. The direct interaction between two magnetic dipoles depends on the relative position of two nuclei in such a way that when averaged over all possible orientations of the molecule it equals to zero.

In November 1951, N. F. Ramsey and E. M. Purcell proposed a mechanism that explained the observation and gave rise to an interaction of the form I_{1}·I_{2}. The mechanism is the magnetic interaction between each nucleus and the electron spin of its own atom together with the exchange coupling of the electron spins with each other.

In the 1990s, direct evidence was found for the presence of J-couplings between magnetically active nuclei on both sides of the hydrogen bond. Initially, it was surprising to observe such couplings across hydrogen bonds since J-couplings are usually associated with the presence of purely covalent bonds. However, it is now well established that the H-bond J-couplings follow the same electron-mediated polarization mechanism as their covalent counterparts.

The spin–spin coupling between nonbonded atoms in close proximity has sometimes been observed between fluorine, nitrogen, carbon, silicon and phosphorus atoms.

== See also ==
- Earth's field NMR (EFNMR)
- Exclusive correlation spectroscopy (ECOSY)
- Magnetic dipole–dipole interaction (dipolar coupling)
- Nuclear magnetic resonance (NMR)
- Nuclear magnetic resonance spectroscopy of carbohydrates
- Nuclear magnetic resonance spectroscopy of nucleic acids
- Nuclear magnetic resonance spectroscopy of proteins
- Proton NMR
- Relaxation (NMR)
- Residual dipolar coupling
