= Magnetic dipole–dipole interaction =

Direct interaction between two magnetic dipoles

Magnetic dipole–dipole interaction, also called dipolar coupling or dipolar interaction, refers to the direct interaction between two magnetic dipoles. Roughly speaking, the magnetic field of a dipole goes as the inverse cube of the distance, and the force of its magnetic field on another dipole goes as the first derivative of the magnetic field. It follows that the dipole-dipole interaction goes as the inverse fourth power of the distance.

== Mathematical description ==
=== In classical magnetostatics ===
If two or more magnets are small enough or sufficiently distant that their shape and size is not important then both magnets can be modeled as being magnetic dipoles having a magnetic moments m_{1} and m_{2}. In case of uniformly magnetized spherical magnets this model is precise even at finite size and distance, as the outside field of such magnets is exactly a dipole field.

Magnetic field of an ideal dipole.

The magnetic field of a magnetic dipole in vector notation is:
$$\mathbf{B}(\mathbf{m}, \mathbf{r}) = \frac{\mu_0}{4\pi r^3} \left(3(\mathbf{m}\cdot\hat{\mathbf{r}})\hat{\mathbf{r}} - \mathbf{m}\right) + \frac{2\mu_0}{3}\mathbf{m}\delta^3(\mathbf{r})$$
where

- B is the field
- r is the vector from the position of the dipole to the position where the field is being measured
- r is the absolute value of r: the distance from the dipole
- $\hat{\mathbf{r}} = \mathbf{r} / r$ is the unit vector parallel to r;
- m is the (vector) dipole moment
- μ_{0} is the permeability of free space
- δ^{3} is the three-dimensional delta function.

This is exactly the field of a point dipole, exactly the dipole term in the multipole expansion of an arbitrary field, and approximately the field of any dipole-like configuration at large distances.

Frames of reference for calculating the forces between two dipoles

Force between coaxial cylinder magnets. According to the dipole approximation, the force drops proportional to $1/z^4$ for large distance z, resulting in slopes of −4 in the log–log plot.

If the coordinate system is shifted to center it on m_{1} and rotated such that the x-axis points in the direction of m_{1} then the previous equation simplifies to
$$\begin{align}
B_x(\mathbf{r}) &= \frac{\mu_0}{4 \pi} m_1 \left(\frac{3\cos^2\theta - 1}{r^3}\right) \\
B_y(\mathbf{r}) &= \frac{\mu_0}{4 \pi} m_1 \left(\frac{3\cos\theta\sin\theta}{r^3}\right),
\end{align}$$
where the variables r and θ are measured in a frame of reference with origin in m_{1} and oriented such that m_{1} is at the origin pointing in the x-direction. This frame is called Local coordinates and is shown in the Figure on the right.

The force of one magnetic dipole on another is determined by using the magnetic field of the first dipole given above and determining the force due to the magnetic field on the second dipole using the force equation:

$$\mathbf{F} = \nabla \left(\mathbf{m}\cdot\mathbf{B}\right),$$
where the gradient ∇ is the change of the quantity m · B per unit distance, and the direction is that of maximum increase of m · B. Using vector notation, the force of a magnetic dipole m_{1} on the magnetic dipole m_{2} is:
$$\mathbf{F}(\mathbf{r}, \mathbf{m}_1, \mathbf{m}_2) =
\frac{3 \mu_0}{4 \pi r^5}\left[
(\mathbf{m}_1\cdot\mathbf{r})\mathbf{m}_2 +
(\mathbf{m}_2\cdot\mathbf{r})\mathbf{m}_1 +
(\mathbf{m}_1\cdot\mathbf{m}_2)\mathbf{r} -
\frac{5(\mathbf{m}_1\cdot\mathbf{r})(\mathbf{m}_2\cdot\mathbf{r})}{r^2} \mathbf{r}
\right]$$
where r is the distance-vector from dipole moment m_{1} to dipole moment m_{2}, with r = ‖r‖. The force acting on m_{1} is in opposite direction. As an example the magnetic force for two magnets pointing in the z-direction and aligned on the z-axis and separated by the distance z is:

$\mathbf{F}(z,m_1, m_2) = -\frac{3 \mu_0 m_1 m_2}{2 \pi z^4}$, z-direction.

The final formulas are shown next. They are expressed in the global coordinate system,
$$\begin{align}
F_r(\mathbf{r}, \alpha, \beta) &= -\frac{3 \mu_0}{4 \pi}\frac{m_2 m_1}{r^4}\left[2\cos(\phi - \alpha)\cos(\phi - \beta) - \sin(\phi - \alpha)\sin(\phi - \beta)\right] \\
F_\phi(\mathbf{r}, \alpha, \beta) &= -\frac{3 \mu_0}{4 \pi}\frac{m_2 m_1}{r^4}\sin(2\phi - \alpha - \beta)
\end{align}$$

=== Classical Hamiltonian of ===
Consider two classical point-like magnetic dipole moments m_{1} and m_{2} in Cartesian coordinate system. In our model we will consider a dipole interaction in the following way. Due to the long range interaction of the magnetic field produced by the dipole, one dipole can interact with the field produced by the other such that the potential energy landscape is given by: $U_{ij} = -\mathbf m_i\cdot{\mathbf B}_j \, ,$ where the indices label the dipole moments. The interaction Hamiltonian of this system calculated to be of the following form:

$$H = -\frac{\mu_0}{4\pi|\mathbf r|^3}\left[ 3(\mathbf m_1\cdot\hat\mathbf r)(\mathbf m_2\cdot\hat\mathbf r)  - \mathbf m_1\cdot\mathbf m_2\right]-\mu_0 \frac{2}{3} \mathbf m_1\cdot\mathbf m_2 \delta(\mathbf r),$$

where μ_{0} is the magnetic constant, $\hat\mathbf r$ is a unit vector parallel center line passing through both dipoles, and |r| is the distance between the centers of m_{1} and m_{2}. Last term with $\delta$-function vanishes everywhere but the origin, and is necessary to ensure that $\nabla\cdot\mathbf B$ vanishes everywhere.

=== In quantum mechanics ===
This previous Hamiltonian can be simply adapted for a quantum mechanical picture. Consider two spin-1/2 particles S_{1} and S_{2} with gyromagnetic ratios γ_{1} and γ_{2}. The Hamiltonian can now be written as

$$H = -\frac{\mu_0\gamma_1\gamma_2\hbar^2}{4\pi|\mathbf r|^3 } \left[3(\mathbf S_1 \cdot\hat\mathbf r)(\mathbf S_2\cdot\hat\mathbf r)-\mathbf S_1\cdot\mathbf S_2\right].$$

The force F arising from the interaction between m_{1} and m_{2} is given by:

$$\mathbf F = \frac{3\mu_0}{4\pi|\mathbf r|^4}\{(\hat\mathbf r\cdot\mathbf m_1)\mathbf m_2 +(\hat\mathbf r\cdot\mathbf m_2)\mathbf m_1 + \hat\mathbf r(\mathbf m_1 \cdot \mathbf m_2) - 5\hat\mathbf r[(\hat\mathbf r\cdot\mathbf m_1)(\hat\mathbf r\cdot\mathbf m_2)]\}.$$

The Fourier transform of H can be calculated from the fact that

$$\frac{3 (\mathbf m_1\cdot\hat\mathbf r)(\mathbf m_2\cdot\hat\mathbf r)  - \mathbf m_1\cdot\mathbf m_2}{4\pi|\mathbf r|^3} = (\mathbf m_1\cdot\mathbf \nabla)(\mathbf m_2\cdot\mathbf \nabla)\frac{1}{4\pi |\mathbf r|}$$

and is given by

$$H = {\mu_0}\frac{  (\mathbf m_1\cdot\mathbf q)(\mathbf m_2\cdot\mathbf q)  - |\mathbf q|^2 \mathbf m_1\cdot\mathbf m_2}{|\mathbf q|^2}.$$

== NMR spectroscopy ==
The direct dipole-dipole coupling is very useful for molecular structural studies, since it depends only on known physical constants and the inverse cube of internuclear distance. Estimation of this coupling provides a direct spectroscopic route to the distance between nuclei and hence the geometrical form of the molecule, or additionally also on intermolecular distances in the solid state leading to NMR crystallography notably in amorphous materials.

For example, in water, NMR spectra of hydrogen atoms of water molecules are narrow lines because dipole coupling is averaged due to chaotic molecular motion. In solids, where water molecules are fixed in their positions and do not participate in the diffusion mobility, the corresponding NMR spectra have the form of the Pake doublet. In solids with vacant positions, dipole coupling is averaged partially due to water diffusion which proceeds according to the symmetry of the solids and the probability distribution of molecules between the vacancies.

Although internuclear magnetic dipole couplings contain a great deal of structural information, in isotropic solution, they average to zero as a result of diffusion. However, their effect on nuclear spin relaxation results in measurable nuclear Overhauser effects (NOEs).

The residual dipolar coupling (RDC) occurs if the molecules in solution exhibit a partial alignment leading to an incomplete averaging of spatially anisotropic magnetic interactions i.e. dipolar couplings. RDC measurement provides information on the global folding of the protein-long distance structural information. It also provides information about "slow" dynamics in molecules.

== See also ==
- J-coupling
- Magic angle
- Residual dipolar coupling
- Nuclear Overhauser effect
- Magnetic moment
- Zero field splitting
