= Solid-state nuclear magnetic resonance =

Technique in spectroscopy

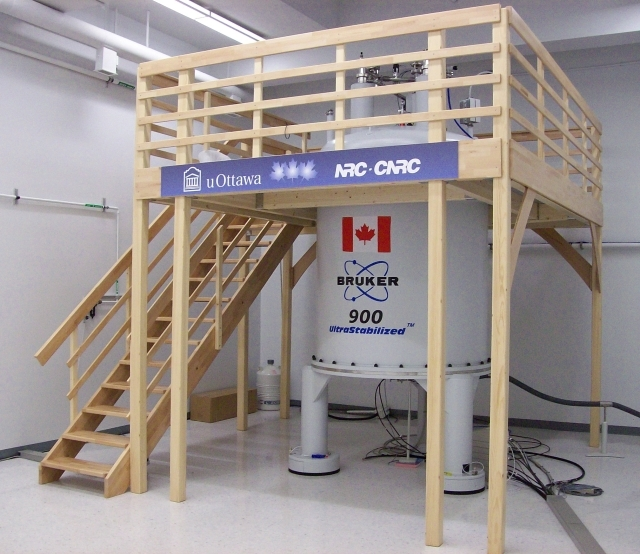
Solid-state 900 MHz (21.1 T) NMR spectrometer at the Canadian National Ultrahigh-field NMR Facility for Solids

Solid-state nuclear magnetic resonance (ssNMR) is a spectroscopy technique used to characterize atomic-level structure and dynamics in solid materials. ssNMR spectra are broader due to nuclear spin interactions which can be categorized as dipolar coupling, chemical shielding, quadrupolar interactions, and j-coupling. These interactions directly affect the lines shapes of experimental ssNMR spectra which can be seen in powder and dipolar patterns. There are many essential solid-state techniques alongside advanced ssNMR techniques that may be applied to elucidate the fundamental aspects of solid materials. ssNMR is often combined with magic angle spinning (MAS) to remove anisotropic interactions and improve the sensitivity of the technique. The applications of ssNMR further extend to biology and medicine.

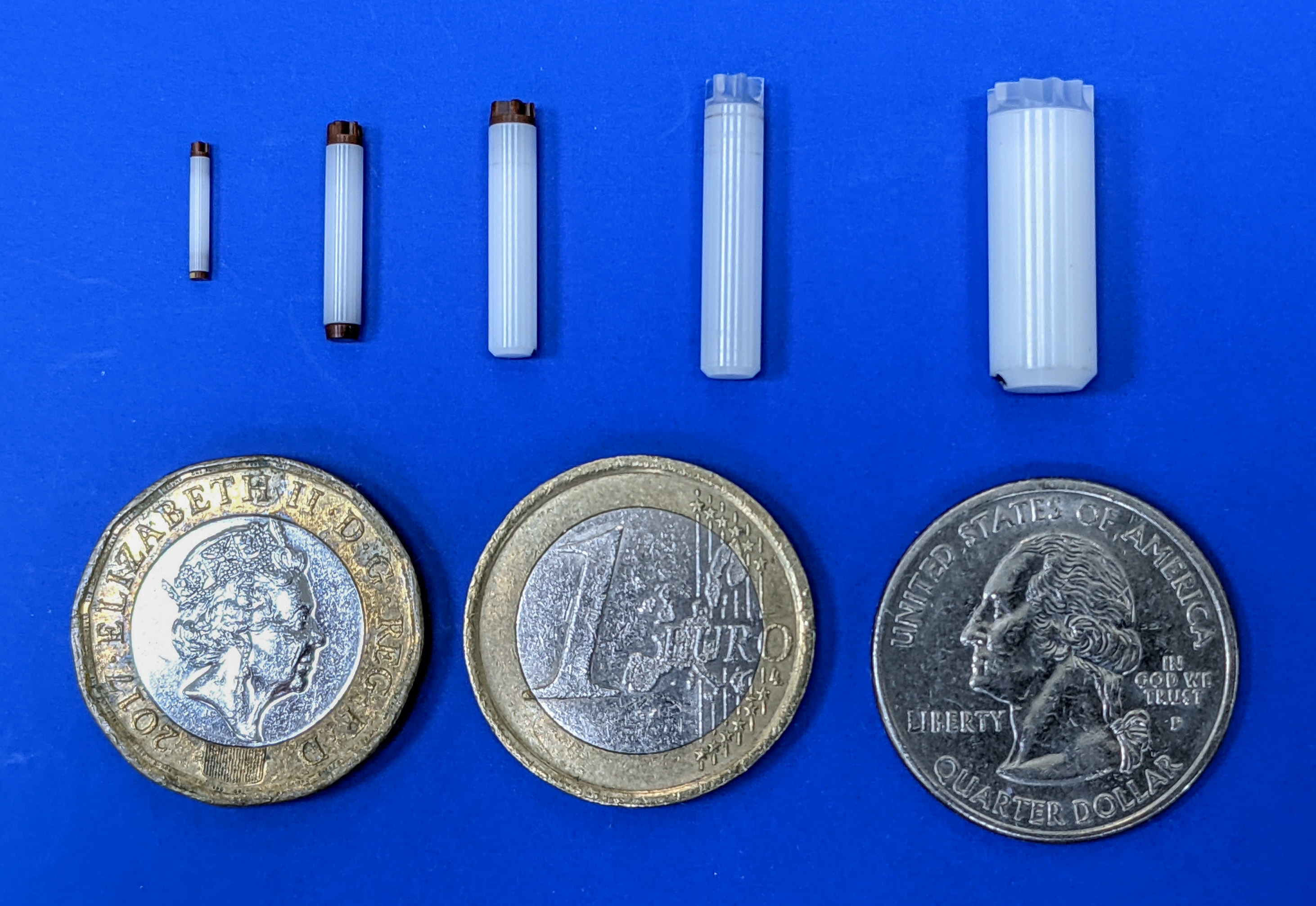
Bruker MAS rotors. From left to right: 1.3 mm (up to 67 kHz), 2.5 mm (up to 35 kHz), 3.2 mm (up to 24 kHz), 4 mm (up to 15 kHz), 7 mm (up to 7 kHz)

== Nuclear spin interactions ==
The resonance frequency of a nuclear spin depends on the strength of the magnetic field at the nucleus, which can be modified by isotropic (e.g. chemical shift, isotropic J-coupling) and anisotropic interactions (e.g. chemical shift anisotropy, dipolar interactions). In a classical liquid-state NMR experiment, molecular tumbling coming from Brownian motion averages anisotropic interactions to zero and they are therefore not reflected in the NMR spectrum. However, in media with no or little mobility (e.g. crystalline powders, glasses, large membrane vesicles, molecular aggregates), anisotropic local fields or interactions have substantial influence on the behaviour of nuclear spins, which results in the line broadening of the NMR spectra.

=== Chemical shielding ===
Chemical shielding is a local property of each nuclear site in a molecule or compound, and is proportional to the applied external magnetic field. The external magnetic field induces currents of the electrons in molecular orbitals. These induced currents create local magnetic fields that lead to characteristic changes in resonance frequency. These changes can be predicted from molecular structure using empirical rules or quantum-chemical calculations.

In general, the chemical shielding is anisotropic because of the anisotropic distribution of molecular orbitals around the nuclear sites. Under sufficiently fast magic angle spinning, or under the effect of molecular tumbling in solution-state NMR, the anisotropic dependence of the chemical shielding is time-averaged to zero, leaving only the isotropic chemical shift.

=== Dipolar coupling ===
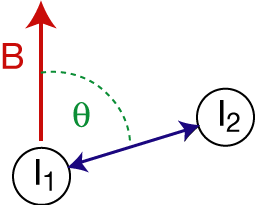
Vectors important for dipolar coupling between nuclear spins I_{1} and I_{2}. θ is the angle between the vector connecting I_{1} and I_{2}, and the magnetic field B.

Nuclear spins exhibit a magnetic dipole moment, which generates a magnetic field that interacts with the dipole moments of other nuclei (dipolar coupling). The magnitude of the interaction is dependent on the gyromagnetic ratio of the spin species, the internuclear distance r, and the orientation, with respect to the external magnetic field B, of the vector connecting the two nuclear spins (see figure). The maximum dipolar coupling is given by the dipolar coupling constant d,

$$d = \hbar \left( \frac{\mu_0}{4 \pi} \right) \frac{1}{r^3}\gamma_1 \gamma_2$$,

where γ_{1} and γ_{2} are the gyromagnetic ratios of the nuclei, $\hbar$ is the reduced Planck constant, and $\mu_0$ is the vacuum permeability. In a strong magnetic field, the dipolar coupling depends on the angle θ between the internuclear vector and the external magnetic field B (figure) according to

$$D \propto 3\cos^2\theta - 1$$.

D becomes zero for $\theta_m = \arccos \sqrt{1/3}= \arctan \sqrt{2} \simeq 54.7^\circ$. Consequently, two nuclei with a dipolar coupling vector at an angle of θ_{m} = 54.7° to a strong external magnetic field have zero dipolar coupling. θ_{m} is called the magic angle. Magic angle spinning is typically used to remove dipolar couplings weaker than the spinning rate.

=== Quadrupolar interaction ===
Nuclei with a spin quantum number >1/2 have a non-spherical charge distribution and a quadrupole moment. The quadrupole moment is a second rank tensor that couples to the surrounding electric field gradient, another second rank tensor. Nuclear quadrupole coupling is typically the second largest interaction in NMR, comparable in size to the largest interaction called Zeeman interactions. When the nuclear quadrupole coupling is not negligible relative to the Zeeman coupling, higher order corrections are needed to describe the NMR spectrum correctly. In such cases, the first-order correction to the NMR transition frequency leads to a strong anisotropic line broadening of the NMR spectrum. However, all symmetric transitions, between $m_I$ and $-m_I$ levels are unaffected by the first-order frequency contribution. The second-order frequency contribution depends on the P_{4} Legendre polynomial, which has zero points at 30.6° and 70.1°. These anisotropic broadenings can be removed using DOR (DOuble angle Rotation) where you spin at two angles at the same time, or DAS (Double Angle Spinning) where you switch quickly between the two angles. Both techniques were developed in the late 1980s, and require specialized hardware (probe). Multiple quantum magic angle spinning (MQMAS) NMR was developed in 1995 and has become a routine method for obtaining high resolution solid-state NMR spectra of quadrupolar nuclei. A similar method to MQMAS is satellite transition magic angle spinning (STMAS) NMR developed in 2000.

=== J-coupling ===
The J-coupling or indirect nuclear spin-spin coupling (sometimes also called "scalar" coupling despite the fact that J is a tensor quantity) describes the interaction of nuclear spins through chemical bonds. J-couplings are not always resolved in solids owing to the typically large linewdiths observed in solid state NMR.

=== Other interactions ===
Paramagnetic substances are subject to the Knight shift.

== Solid-state NMR line shapes ==
=== Powder pattern ===
Simulations of the shape of different powder patterns for different asymmetry $\eta$ and chemical shift anisotropy $\Delta_{CS}$parameters.

A powder pattern arises in powdered samples where crystallites are randomly oriented relative to the magnetic field so that all molecular orientations are present. In presence of a chemical shift anisotropy interaction, each orientation with respect to the magnetic field gives a different resonance frequency. If enough crystallites are present, all the different contributions overlap continuously and lead to a smooth spectrum.

Fitting of the pattern in a static ssNMR experiment gives information about the shielding tensor, which are often described by the isotropic chemical shift $\delta_{iso}$, the chemical shift anisotropy parameter $\Delta_{CS}$, and the asymmetry parameter $\eta$.

=== Dipolar pattern ===
Dipolar powder pattern (Pake pattern)

The dipolar powder pattern (also Pake pattern) has a very characteristic shape that arises when two nuclear spins are coupled together within a crystallite. The splitting between the maxima (the "horns") of the pattern is equal to the dipolar coupling constant $d$.:

$$d = \hbar \left( \frac{\mu_0}{4 \pi} \right) \frac{1}{r^3}\gamma_1 \gamma_2$$

where γ_{1} and γ_{2} are the gyromagnetic ratios of the dipolar-coupled nuclei, $r$ is the internuclear distance, $\hbar$ is the reduced Planck constant, and $\mu_0$ is the vacuum permeability.

== Essential solid-state techniques ==
=== Magic angle spinning ===
Simulation of an increasing MAS rate on the ^{13}C solid-state NMR spectrum of ^{13}C-Glycine at 9.4 T (400 MHz ^{1}H frequency). MAS introduces a set of spinning sidebands separated from the isotropic frequency by a multiple of the spinning rate.

Magic angle spinning (MAS) is a technique routinely used in ssNMR to improve ssNMR spectra resolution. After applying the MAS technique, NMR spectra will be sharper and narrower. This improved resolution results from manipulating a sample's spin interactions with the applied magnetic field. This is achieved by rotating the sample at a certain angle to the magnetic field to fully or partially average out anisotropic nuclear interactions such as dipolar, chemical shift anisotropy, and quadrupolar interactions. This rotation angle is called the magic angle θ_{m} (ca. 54.74°, where cos^{2}θ_{m} = 1/3). To achieve the complete averaging of these interactions, the sample needs to be spun at a rate that is at least higher than the largest anisotropy.

Spinning a powder sample at a slower rate than the largest component of the chemical shift anisotropy results in an incomplete averaging of the interaction, and produces a set of spinning sidebands in addition to the isotropic line, centred at the isotropic chemical shift. Spinning sidebands are sharp lines separated from the isotropic frequency by a multiple of the spinning rate. Although spinning sidebands can be used to measure anisotropic interactions, they are often undesirable and removed by spinning the sample faster or by recording the data points synchronously with the rotor period.

=== Cross-polarization ===
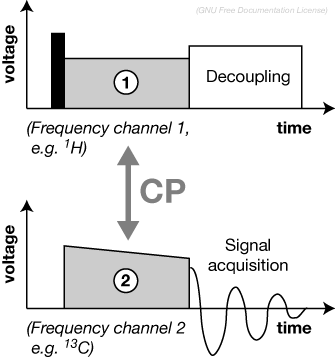
The CP pulse sequence. The sequence starts with a 90º pulse on the abundant channel (typically H). Then CP contact pulses matching the Hartmann-Hahn condition are applied to transfer the magnetisation from H to X. Finally, the free induction decay (FID) of the X nuclei is detected, typically with ^{1}H decoupling.

Cross-polarization (CP) if a fundamental (Radiofrequency) RF pulse sequence and a building-block in many solid-state NMR. It is typically used to enhance the signal of a dilute nuclei with a low gyromagnetic ratio (e.g. ^{13}C, ^{15}N) by magnetization transfer from an abundant nuclei with a high gyromagnetic ratio (e.g. ^{1}H), or as a spectral editing method to get through space information (e.g. directed ^{15}N→^{13}C CP in protein spectroscopy).

To establish magnetization transfer, RF pulses ("contact pulses") are simultaneously applied on both frequency channels to produce $B_1$ fields whose strength fulfil the Hartmann–Hahn condition:

$$\gamma_H B_1(^{1}\text{H}) = \gamma_X B_1(\text{X}) \pm n \omega_R$$

where $\gamma$ are the gyromagnetic ratios, $\omega_R$ is the spinning rate, and $n$ is an integer. In practice, the pulse power, as well as the length of the contact pulse are experimentally optimised. The power of one contact pulse is typically ramped to achieve a more broadband and efficient magnetisation transfer.

=== Decoupling ===
Spin interactions can be removed (decoupled) to increase the resolution of NMR spectra during the detection, or to extend the lifetime of the nuclear magnetization.

Heteronuclear decoupling is achieved by radio-frequency irradiation on at the frequency of the nucleus to be decoupled, which is often ^{1}H. The irradiation can be continuous (continuous wave decoupling), or a series of pulses that extend the performance and the bandwidth of the decoupling (TPPM, SPINAL-64, SWf-TPPM)

Homonuclear decoupling is achieved with multiple-pulse sequences (WAHUHA, MREV-8, BR-24, BLEW-12, FSLG), or continuous wave modulation (DUMBO, eDUMBO). Dipolar interactions can also be removed with magic angle spinning. Ultra fast MAS (from 60 kHz up to above 111 kHz) is an efficient way to average all dipolar interactions, including ^{1}H–^{1}H homonuclear dipolar interactions, which extends the resolution of ^{1}H spectra and enables the usage of pulse sequences used in solution state NMR.

== Advanced solid-state NMR spectroscopy ==
=== Rotational Echo DOuble Resonance (REDOR) ===
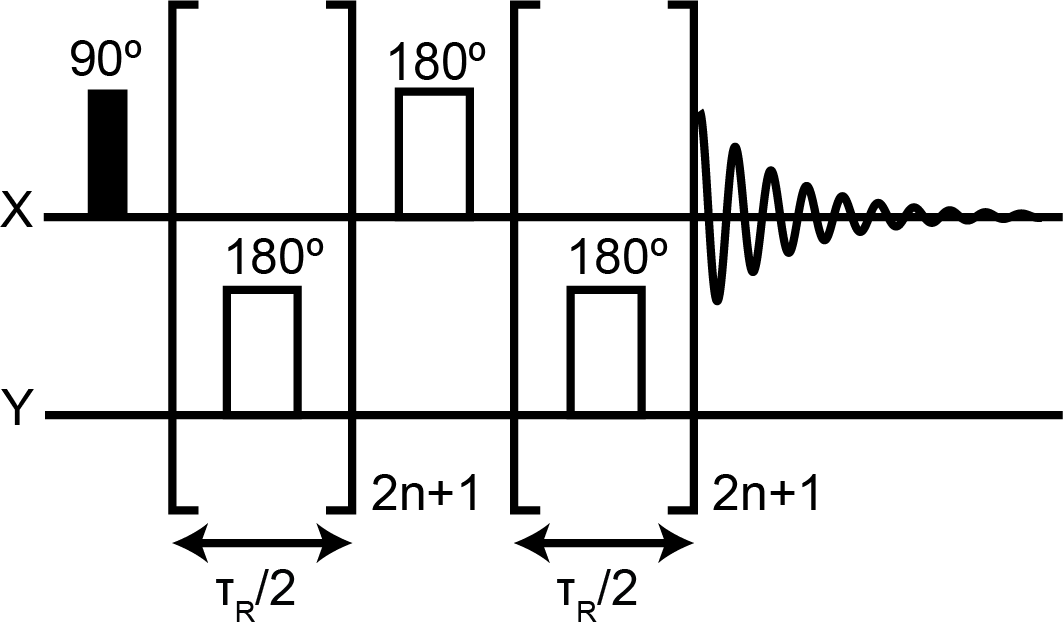
Rotational Echo DOuble Resonance (REDOR) pulse sequence. The first excitation step (90º pulse or CP step) puts the magnetization in the transverse plane. Then two trains of 180º pulses synchronized with the rotor half-period are applied on the Y channel to reintroduce X-Y heteronuclear dipolar interactions. The trains of pulses are interrupted by a 180º pulse on the X channel that allows the refocussing of the X magnetization for the X-detection (spin echo). The delay between the 90º pulse and the beginning of the acquisition is referred to as the "rephrasing time".

Rotational Echo DOuble Resonance (REDOR) experiments, are a type of heteronuclear dipolar recoupling experiment which enables the re-introduction of heteronuclear dipolar couplings averaged by MAS. The reintroduction of such dipolar coupling reduces the intensity of the NMR signal compared to a reference spectrum where no dephasing pulse is used. REDOR can be used to measure heteronuclear distances, and are the basis of NMR crystallographic studies.

=== Ultra fast MAS for ^{1}H NMR ===
The strong ^{1}H-^{1}H homonuclear dipolar interactions associated with broad NMR lines and short T_{2} relaxation time effectively relegate proton for bimolecular NMR. Fast MAS and reduction of dipolar interactions by deuteration have made proton ssNMR as versatile as in solution. This includes spectral dispersion in multi-dimensional experiments and structurally valuable restraints and parameters important for studying material dynamics.

Ultra-fast NMR and the sharpening of the NMR lines enable NMR pulse sequences to capitalize on proton-detection to improve the sensitivity of the experiments compared to the direct detection of a spin-1/2 system (X). Such enhancement factor $\xi$ is given by:

$$\xi \propto \left(\frac{\gamma_H}{\gamma_X}\right)^{3/2} \left(\frac{W_X}{W_H}\right)^{1/2} \left(\frac{Q_H}{Q_X}\right)^{1/2}$$

where $\gamma$ are the gyromagnetic ratios, $W$ represent the NMR line widths, and $Q$ represent the quality factor of the probe resonances.

=== MAS-Dynamic Nuclear Polarisation (MAS-DNP) ===
Magic angle spinning dynamic nuclear polarization (MAS-DNP) is a technique that increases the sensitivity of NMR experiments by several orders of magnitude. It involves transferring the very high electron polarisation from unpaired electrons to nearby nuclei. This is achieved at cryogenic temperatures through a continuous microwave irradiation from a klystron or a gyrotron, with a frequency close to the corresponding electron paramagnetic resonance (EPR) frequency.

The development in the MAS-DNP instrumentation, and the improvement of polarising agents (TOTAPOL, AMUPOL, TEKPOL, etc. ) to achieve a more efficient transfer of polarisation has dramatically reduced experiments times which enabled the observation of surfaces, insensitive isotopes, and multidimensional experiments on low natural abundance nuclei, and diluted species.

=== Beta-Detected Nuclear Magnetic Resonance (β-NMR) ===
Beta-detected nuclear magnetic resonance (β-NMR) is specialized technique that has working principles similar to muon spin spectroscopy. It is used in domains such as chemistry, materials science, condensed matter physics, and biology as a powerful probe. β-NMR is practiced at facilities such as TRIUMF and ISOLDE as well as research groups in Osaka and Moscow.

What makes β-NMR different than conventional NMR is firstly, where and when the spin polarization of the nuclei occurs and secondly, how the signal is produced. To conduct a β-NMR experiment, optical pumping is performed on a radioactive beam of particles, such as ^{8}Li and ^{31}Mg, to polarize their nuclear spin to nearly one-hundred percent. The isotopes are subsequently implanted into a sample in vacuum in the dilute-limit to eliminate homonuclear probe interactions. The spin–lattice relaxation of the probe is monitored by the parity-violating beta-decay of the radioactive isotope. This anisotropic decay is where the signal originates for β-NMR experiment. This technique allows for investigation of the local magnetic and electronic environment within a material .

== Applications ==
ssNMR spectroscopy serves as an effective analytical tool in biological, organic, and inorganic chemistry due to its close resemblance to liquid-state spectra while providing additional insights into anisotropic interactions.

It is used to characterize chemical composition, structure, local motions, kinetics, and thermodynamics, with the special ability to assign the observed behavior to specific sites in a molecule. It is also crucial in the area of surface and interfacial chemistry.

=== Biology and Medicine ===
==== Proteins and bioaggregates ====
ssNMR is used to study insoluble proteins and proteins such as membrane proteins and amyloid fibrils. Using the principles of MAS, protein tertiary structure information can be determined. This includes the assessment of protein dynamics.

==== Biomaterials ====
ssNMR is used to study biomaterials such as bone, teeth, hair, silk, wood, as well as viruses, plants, cells, and collected biopsies.

==== Drugs and drug delivery systems ====
ssNMR is used in pharmaceutical research for the characterization of drug polymorphs and solid dispersions.

=== Materials science ===
ssNMR spectroscopy is used in materials science to analyze solid samples. Here, molecules have restricted motion which leads to complex magnetic interactions, such as dipole-dipole coupling, chemical shift anisotropy, and quadrupolar interactions. These interactions can provide more detailed information than X-ray diffraction or solution NMR spectroscopy about the material's structure to elucidate information on the solid's (crystalline and non-crystalline) local structure and dynamics.

ssNMR has been successfully used to study metal organic frameworks, solid-state batteries, surfaces of nanoporous materials, and polymers.
