= Functional magnetic resonance spectroscopy of the brain =

Technique to study brain metabolism

- Purpose: uses magnetic resonance imaging to study brain metabolism

Functional magnetic resonance spectroscopy of the brain (fMRS) uses magnetic resonance imaging (MRI) to study brain metabolism during brain activation. The data generated by fMRS usually shows spectra of resonances, instead of a brain image, as with MRI. The area under peaks in the spectrum represents relative concentrations of metabolites.

fMRS is based on the same principles as in vivo magnetic resonance spectroscopy (MRS). However, while conventional MRS records a single spectrum of metabolites from a region of interest, a key interest of fMRS is to detect multiple spectra and study metabolite concentration dynamics during brain function. Therefore, it is sometimes referred to as dynamic MRS, event-related MRS or time-resolved MRS. A novel variant of fMRS is functional diffusion-weighted spectroscopy (fDWS) which measures diffusion properties of brain metabolites upon brain activation.

Unlike in vivo MRS which is intensively used in clinical settings, fMRS is used primarily as a research tool, both in a clinical context, for example, to study metabolite dynamics in patients with epilepsy, migraine and dyslexia, and to study healthy brains. fMRS can be used to study metabolism dynamics also in other parts of the body, for example, in muscles and heart; however, brain studies have been far more popular.

The main goals of fMRS studies are to contribute to the understanding of energy metabolism in the brain, and to test and improve data acquisition and quantification techniques to ensure and enhance validity and reliability of fMRS studies.

== Basic principles ==
=== Studied nuclei ===
Like in vivo MRS, fMRS can probe different nuclei, such as hydrogen (^{1}H) and carbon (^{13}C). The ^{1}H nucleus is the most sensitive and is most commonly used to measure metabolite concentrations and concentration dynamics, whereas ^{13}C is best suited for characterizing fluxes and pathways of brain metabolism. The natural abundance of ^{13}C in the brain is only about 1%; therefore, ^{13}C fMRS studies usually involve the isotope enrichment via infusion or ingestion.

In the literature ^{13}C fMRS is commonly referred to as functional ^{13}C MRS or just ^{13}C MRS.

=== Spectral and temporal resolution ===
Typically in MRS a single spectrum is acquired by averaging enough spectra over a long acquisition time. Averaging is necessary because of the complex spectral structures and relatively low concentrations of many brain metabolites, which result in a low signal-to-noise ratio (SNR) in MRS of a living brain.

fMRS differs from MRS by acquiring not one but multiple spectra at different time points while the participant is inside the MRI scanner. Thus, temporal resolution is very important and acquisition times need to be kept adequately short to provide a dynamic rate of metabolite concentration change.

To balance the need for temporal resolution and sufficient SNR, fMRS requires a high magnetic field strength (1.5 T and above). High field strengths have the advantage of increased SNR as well as improved spectral resolution allowing to detect more metabolites and more detailed metabolite dynamics.

fMRS is continuously advancing as stronger magnets become more available and better data acquisition techniques are developed providing increased spectral and temporal resolution. With 7-tesla magnet scanners it is possible to detect around 18 different metabolites of ^{1}H spectrum which is a significant improvement over less powerful magnets. Temporal resolution has increased from 7 minutes in the first fMRS studies to 5 seconds in more recent ones.

=== Spectroscopic technique ===
In fMRS, depending on the focus of the study, either single-voxel or multi-voxel spectroscopic technique can be used.

In single-voxel fMRS the selection of the volume of interest (VOI) is often done by running a functional magnetic resonance imaging (fMRI) study prior to fMRS to localize the brain region activated by the task. Single-voxel spectroscopy requires shorter acquisition times; therefore it is more suitable for fMRS studies where high temporal resolution is needed and where the volume of interest is known.

Multi-voxel spectroscopy provides information about group of voxels and data can be presented in 2D or 3D images, but it requires longer acquisition times and therefore temporal resolution is decreased. Multi-voxel spectroscopy usually is performed when the specific volume of interest is not known or it is important to study metabolite dynamics in a larger brain region.

== Advantages and limitations ==
fMRS has several advantages over other functional neuroimaging and brain biochemistry detection techniques. Unlike push-pull cannula, microdialysis and in vivo voltammetry, fMRS is a non-invasive method for studying dynamics of biochemistry in an activated brain. It is done without exposing subjects to ionizing radiation like it is done in positron emission tomography (PET) or single-photon emission computed tomography (SPECT) studies. fMRS gives a more direct measurement of cellular events occurring during brain activation than BOLD fMRI or PET which rely on hemodynamic responses and show only global neuronal energy uptake during brain activation while fMRS gives also information about underlying metabolic processes that support the working brain.

However, fMRS requires very sophisticated data acquisition, quantification methods and interpretation of results. This is one of the main reasons why in the past it received less attention than other MR techniques, but the availability of stronger magnets and improvements in data acquisition and quantification methods are making fMRS more popular.

Main limitations of fMRS are related to signal sensitivity and the fact that many metabolites of potential interest can not be detected with current fMRS techniques.

Because of limited spatial and temporal resolution fMRS can not provide information about metabolites in different cell types, for example, whether lactate is used by neurons or by astrocytes during brain activation. The smallest volume that can currently be characterized with fMRS is 1 cm^{3}, which is too big to measure metabolites in different cell types. To overcome this limitation, mathematical and kinetic modeling is used.

Many brain areas are not suitable for fMRS studies because they are too small (like small nuclei in brainstem) or too close to bone tissue, CSF or extracranial lipids, which could cause inhomogeneity in the voxel and contaminate the spectra. To avoid these difficulties, in most fMRS studies the volume of interest is chosen from the visual cortex – because it is easily stimulated, has high energy metabolisms, and yields good MRS signals.

== Applications ==
Unlike in vivo MRS which is intensively used in clinical settings, fMRS is used primarily as a research tool, both in a clinical context, for example, to study metabolite dynamics in patients with epilepsy, migraine and dyslexia, and to study healthy brains.

fMRS can be used to study metabolism dynamics also in other parts of the body, for example, in muscles and heart; however, brain studies have been far more popular.

The main goals of fMRS studies are to contribute to the understanding of energy metabolism in the brain, and to test and improve data acquisition and quantification techniques to ensure and enhance validity and reliability of fMRS studies.

=== Brain energy metabolism studies ===
fMRS was developed as an extension of MRS in the early 1990s. Its potential as a research technology became obvious when it was applied to an important research problem where PET studies had been inconclusive, namely the mismatch between oxygen and glucose consumption during sustained visual stimulation. The ^{1}H fMRS studies highlighted the important role of lactate in this process and significantly contributed to the research in brain energy metabolism during brain activation. It confirmed the hypothesis that lactate increases during sustained visual stimulation and allowed the generalization of findings based on visual stimulation to other types of stimulation, e.g., auditory stimulation, motor task and cognitive tasks.

^{1}H fMRS measurements were instrumental in achieving the current consensus among most researchers that lactate levels increase during the first minutes of intense brain activation. However, there are no consistent results about the magnitude of increase, and questions about the exact role of lactate in brain energy metabolism still remain unanswered and are the subject of continuing research.

^{13}C MRS is a special type of fMRS particularly suited for measuring important neurophysiological fluxes in vivo and in real time to assess metabolic activity both in healthy and diseased brains (e.g., in human tumor tissue). These fluxes include TCA cycle, glutamate–glutamine cycle, glucose and oxygen consumption. ^{13}C MRS can provide detailed quantitative information about glucose dynamics that can not be obtained with ^{1}H fMRS, because of the low concentration of glucose in the brain and the spread of its resonances in several multiplets in the ^{1}H MRS spectrum.

^{13}C MRSs have been crucial in recognizing that the awake nonstimulated (resting) human brain is highly active using 70%–80% of its energy for glucose oxidation to support signaling within cortical networks which is suggested to be necessary for consciousness. This finding has an important implication for the interpretation of BOLD fMRI data where this high baseline activity is generally ignored and response to the task is shown as independent of the baseline activity. ^{13}C MRS studies indicate that this approach can misjudge and even completely miss the brain activity induced by the task.

^{13}C MRS findings together with other results from PET and fMRI studies have been combined in a model to explain the function of resting state activity called default mode network.

Another important benefit of ^{13}C MRS is that it provides unique means for determining the time course of metabolite pools and measuring turnover rates of TCA and glutamate–glutamine cycles. As such, it has been proved to be important in aging research by revealing that mitochondrial metabolism is reduced with aging which may explain the decline in cognitive and sensory processes.

=== Water resonance studies ===
Usually, in ^{1}H fMRS the water signal is suppressed to detect metabolites with much lower concentration than water. Though, an unsuppressed water signal can be used to estimate functional changes in the relaxation time T2* during cortical activation.

This approach has been proposed as an alternative to the BOLD fMRI technique and used to detect visual response to photic stimulation, motor activation by finger tapping and activations in language areas during speech processing. Recently functional real-time single-voxel proton spectroscopy (fSVPS) has been proposed as a technique for real-time neurofeedback studies in magnetic fields of 7 tesla (7 T) and above. This approach could have potential advantages over BOLD fMRI and is the subject of current research.

=== Migraine and pain studies ===
fMRS has been used in migraine and pain research. It has supported the important hypothesis of mitochondria dysfunction in migraine with aura (MwA) patients. Here the ability of fMRS to measure chemical processes in the brain over time proved crucial for confirming that repetitive photic stimulation causes higher increase of the lactate level and higher decrease of the N-acetylaspartate (NAA) level in the visual cortex of MwA patients compared to migraine without aura (MwoA) patients and healthy individuals.

In pain research fMRS complements fMRI and PET techniques. Although fMRI and PET are continuously used to localize pain processing areas in the brain, they can not provide direct information about changes in metabolites during pain processing that could help to understand physiological processes behind pain perception and potentially lead to novel treatments for pain. fMRS overcomes this limitation and has been used to study pain-induced (cold-pressure, heat, dental pain) neurotransmitter level changes in the anterior cingulate cortex, anterior insular cortex and left insular cortex. These fMRS studies are valuable because they show that some or all Glx compounds (glutamate, GABA and glutamine) increase during painful stimuli in the studied brain regions.

=== Cognitive studies ===
Cognitive studies frequently rely on the detection of neuronal activity during cognition. The use of fMRS for this purpose is at present mainly at an experimental level but is rapidly increasing. Cognitive tasks where fMRS has been used and the major findings of the research are summarized below.

Cognitive task	Brain region	Major findings
Silent word generation task	Left inferior frontal gyrus	Increased lactate level during the task in young alert participants, but not in young participants with prolonged wakefulness and aged participants implying that aging and prolonged wakefulness may result in a dysfunction of the brain energy metabolism and cause impairment of the frontal cortex.
Motor sequence learning task	Contralateral primary sensorimotor cortex	Decreased GABA level during the task suggesting that GABA modulation occurs with encoding of the task.
Prolonged match-to-sample working memory task	Left dorsolateral prefrontal cortex	Increased GABA level during the first working memory run and continuously decreased during subsequent three runs. Decrease of GABA over time correlated with decreases in reaction time and higher task accuracy.
Presentation of abstract and real world objects	Lateral occipital cortex	Higher increase in glutamate level with the presentation of abstract versus real world objects. In this study fMRS was used simultaneously with EEG and positive correlation between gamma-band activity and glutamate level changes was observed.
Stroop task	Anterior cingulate cortex (ACC)	Demonstration of phosphocreatine dynamics with 12s temporal resolution. Stroop task for this study was chosen because it has been previously shown that left ACC is significantly activated during the performance of stroop task. The main implication of this study was that reliable fMRS measures are possible in the ACC during cognitive tasks.

== See also ==
- Brain metabolism
- Magnetic resonance imaging
- Nuclear magnetic resonance spectroscopy
- Fourier-transform spectroscopy
- Adjusting the homogeneity of a magnetic field
