= Nanomaterials and cancer =

Nanomaterials have gained significant attention in the field of cancer research and treatment due to their unique properties and potential applications. These materials, typically on the nanoscale (measuring less than 100 nanometers), offer several advantages in the fight against cancer.

== Use in cancer treatment ==
Here are some ways nanomaterials are used in cancer treatment:

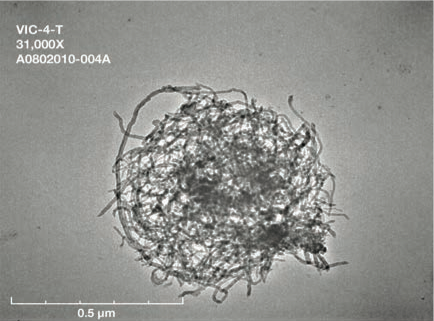
- Nano-materials Aerosol
  Drug delivery systems: Nanoparticles can be loaded with anticancer drugs, improving drug solubility, stability, and targeted delivery to cancer cells. This enhances the drug's therapeutic effect while reducing side effects on healthy tissues.
- Photothermal therapy: Certain nanoparticles, like gold nanoparticles or carbon nanotubes, can absorb light and convert it into heat. This property is harnessed for photothermal therapy, where these particles are targeted to cancer cells and then heated with laser light, causing localized cell damage and cell death.
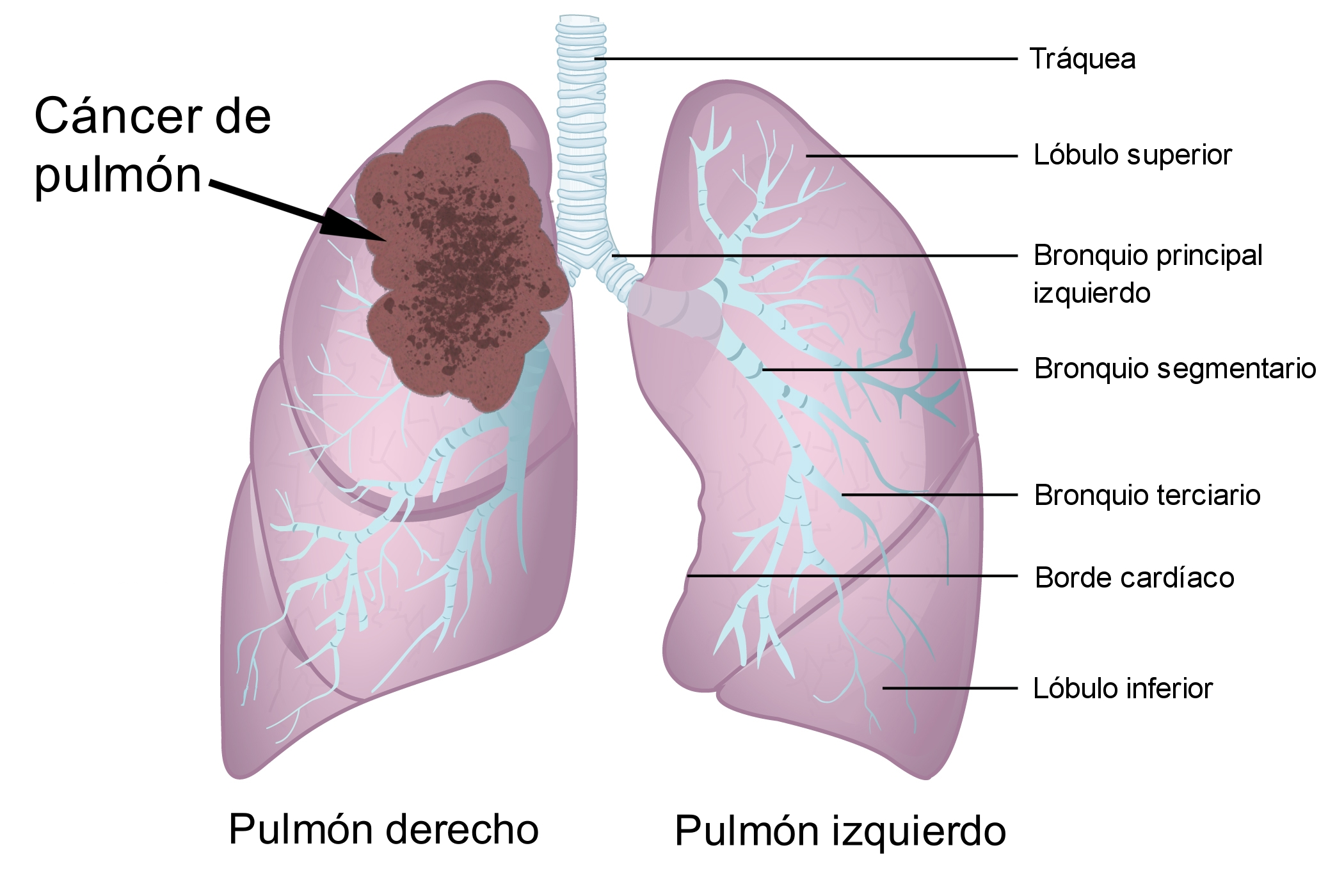
- Lung cancer
  Photodynamic therapy: Nanoparticles can be used as carriers for photosensitizing agents. When exposed to light of a specific wavelength, these agents generate reactive oxygen species, which can kill cancer cells or damage their structural components.
- MRI contrast agents: Nanomaterials with magnetic properties, such as iron oxide nanoparticles, are used as contrast agents in magnetic resonance imaging (MRI). They can help detect and visualize tumors with high precision.
- Radiotherapy enhancers: Some nanoparticles, like high atomic number nanoparticles, can enhance the effects of radiation therapy. They increase the absorption of ionizing radiation, leading to improved tumor cell damage while sparing healthy tissue.
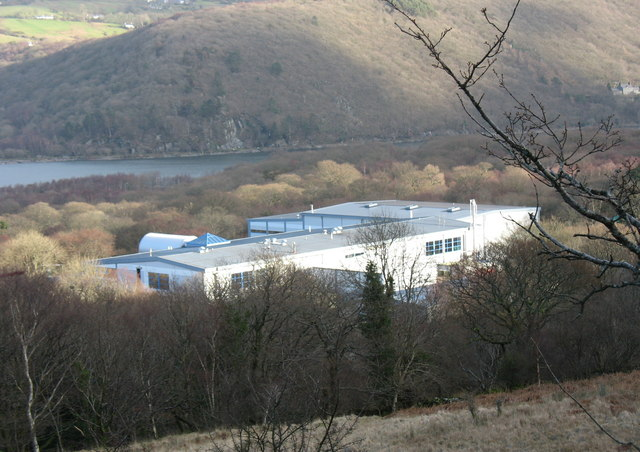
- Medical Diagnostic Factory
  Diagnostic tools and medical factory: Quantum dots and other nanomaterials are used in cancer diagnostics. They can be designed to specifically target cancer biomarkers, allowing for highly sensitive and accurate detection of cancer cells or molecules associated with cancer.
- Gene therapy: Nanocarriers, such as lipid nanoparticles or polymer nanoparticles, can deliver therapeutic genes to cancer cells. This approach aims to modify the genetic makeup of the cancer cells, either to inhibit their growth or sensitize them to other treatments.
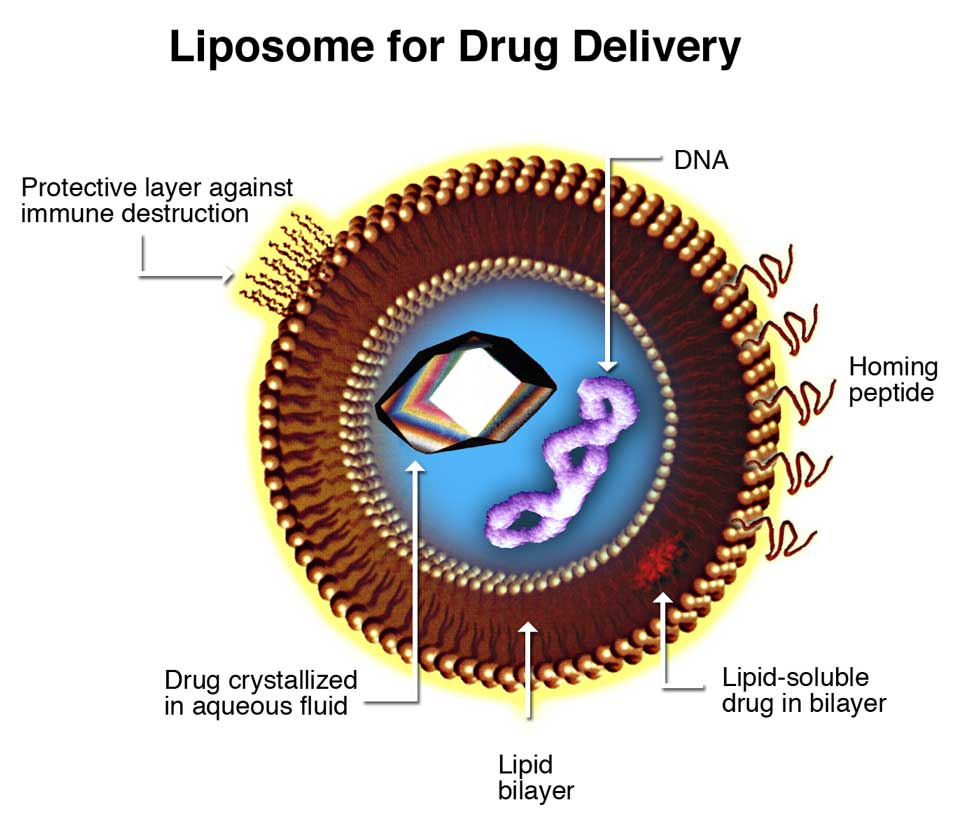
- Liposome
  Immunotherapy enhancement: Nanomaterials can be used to enhance the effectiveness of immunotherapies. They can serve as carriers for immune checkpoint inhibitors, vaccines, or other immunomodulatory agents.
- Intracellular drug delivery: Some nanoparticles are designed to penetrate cancer cells and release therapeutic payloads directly into their interior. This can be especially valuable for targeting resistant or hard-to-reach cancer cells.
- Personalized medicine: The versatility of nanomaterials allows for the development of personalized cancer therapies. Tailoring nanoparticle properties to match an individual's specific cancer type and genetic makeup can improve treatment outcomes.
- Minimally invasive surgery: Nanomaterials can enable minimally invasive surgical techniques. Nanorobots or nanocapsules can be designed to perform precise procedures, such as tumor resection or drug delivery, with minimal damage to surrounding tissue.

While nanomaterials hold potential in cancer treatment, there are also challenges related to their safety, potential toxicity, and regulatory considerations. Extensive research and rigorous testing are required to ensure the efficacy and safety of these materials in clinical applications. The field of nanomedicine continues to evolve and holds potential for improving cancer diagnosis and treatment.
