= Open flow microperfusion =

Medical sampling method

Open flow microperfusion (OFM) is a sampling method for clinical and preclinical drug development studies and biomarker research. OFM is designed for continuous sampling of analytes from the interstitial fluid (ISF) of various tissues. It provides direct access to the ISF by insertion of a small, minimally invasive, membrane-free probe with macroscopic openings. Thus, the entire biochemical information of the ISF becomes accessible regardless of the analyte's molecular size, protein-binding property or lipophilicity.

OFM is capable of sampling lipophilic and hydrophilic compounds, protein bound and unbound drugs, neurotransmitters, peptides and proteins, antibodies, nanoparticles and nanocarriers, enzymes and vesicles.

== Method ==
The OFM probes are perfused with a physiological solution (the perfusate) which equilibrates with the ISF of the surrounding tissue. Operating flow rates range from 0.1 to 10 μL/min. OFM allows unrestricted exchange of compounds via an open structure across the open exchange area of the probe. This exchange of compounds between the probe’s perfusate and the surrounding ISF is driven by convection and diffusion, and occurs non-selectively in either direction (Figure 1).

Figure 1: Schematic illustration of a linear OFM probe. Exchange of compounds between the open exchange area of the OFM probe and the surrounding interstitial fluid.

The direct liquid pathway between the probe’s perfusate and the surrounding fluid results in collection of ISF samples. These samples can be collected frequently and are then subjected to bioanalytical analysis to enable monitoring of substance concentrations with temporal resolution during the whole sampling period.

Figure 2: Schematic illustration of a concentric OFM probe.

The concentric OFM probe (Figure 2) works according to the same principle. The perfusate is pumped to the tip of the OFM probe through the inner, thin lumen and exits beyond the Open Exchange Area, where it then mixes with exogenous substances present in the ISF before being withdrawn through the outer, thick lumen.

== History ==
The first OFM sampling probe to be used as an alternative to microdialysis was described in an Austrian patent application filed by Falko Skrabal in 1987, where OFM was described as a device, which can be implanted into the tissue of living organisms. In 1992, a US patent was filed claiming a device for determining at least one medical variable in the tissue of living organisms. In a later patent by Helmut Masoner, Falko Skrabal and Helmut List a linear type of the sampling probe with macroscopic circular holes was also disclosed. Alternative and current OFM versions for dermal and adipose tissue application were developed by Joanneum Research, and were patented by Manfred Bodenlenz et al. Alternative materials featuring low absorption were used to enable manufacturing of probes with diameters of 0.55 mm and exchange areas of 15 mm in length. For cerebral application, special OFM probes were patented by Birngruber et al. Additionally, a patent was filed to manage the fluid handling of the ISF by using a portable peristaltic pump with a flow range of 0.1 to 10 μL/min that enables operation of up to three probes per pump.

== OFM System ==
Two types of OFM probes are currently available: Linear OFM probes for implantation into superficial tissues such as skin (dermal OFM, dOFM) and subcutaneous adipose tissue (adipose OFM, aOFM) as well as concentric probes for implantation into various regions of the brain (cerebral OFM, cOFM).

== Areas of application ==
OFM is routinely applied in pharmaceutical research in preclinical (e.g. mice, rats, pigs, primates) and in clinical studies in humans (Figure 3). OFM-related procedures such as probe insertions or prolonged sampling with numerous probes are well tolerated by the subjects.

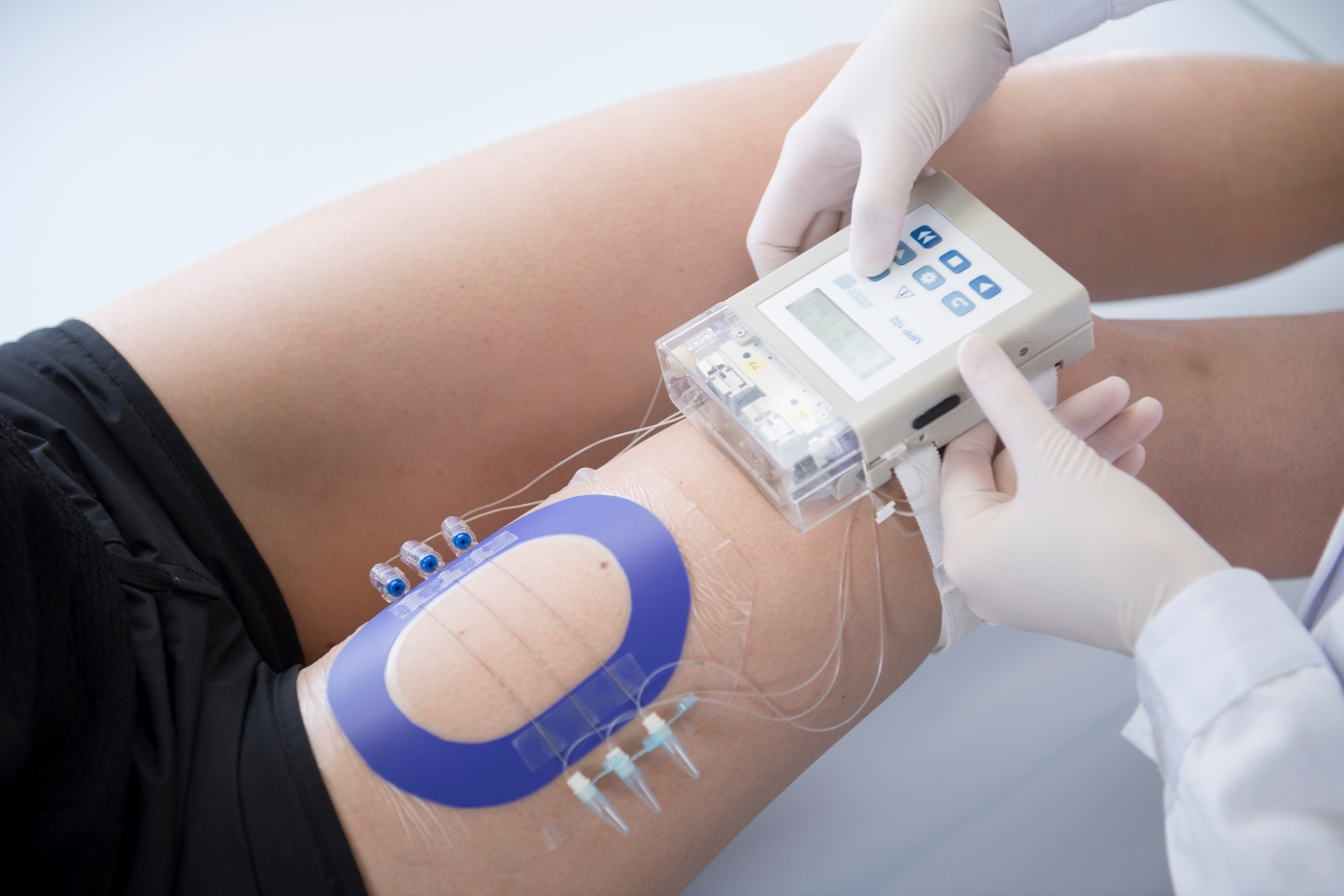
Figure 3: OFM system for clinical use, up to 48 hours, consisting of catheter, tubing, perfusate bag, pump and sample collection, All products are CE-certified.

=== Dermal OFM (dOFM) ===
dOFM (Figure 4) allows the investigation of transport of drugs in the dermis and their penetration into the dermis after local, topical or systemic application, and dOFM is mentioned by the U.S. Food and Drug Administration as a new method for assessment of bioequivalence of topical drugs.

dOFM is used for:

- conduct tissue-specific pharmacokinetic (PK) and pharmacodynamic (PD) studies of drugs.
- perform head-to-head comparison of novel topical drug formulations
- assess dermal bioavailability.
- investigate high molecular weight compounds, e.g. antibodies

Head-to-head settings with OFM have proven particularly useful for the evaluation of topical generic products, which need to demonstrate bioequivalence to the reference listed drug product to obtain market approval.

Applications of dOFM include ex vivo studies with tissue explants and preclinical and clinical in vivo studies.

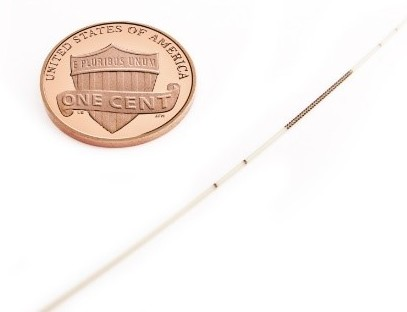
Figure 4: Linear aOFM/dOFM probe

=== Adipose OFM (aOFM) ===
aOFM (Figure 4) allows continuous on-line monitoring of metabolic processes in the subcutaneous adipose tissue, e.g. glucose and lactate, as well as larger analytes such as insulin (5.9 kDa). The role of polypeptides for metabolic signaling (leptin, cytokine IL-6, TNFα) has also been studied with aOFM. aOFM allows the quantification of proteins (e.g. albumin size: 68 kDa) in adipose tissue and thus opens up the possibility to investigate protein-bound drugs directly in peripheral target tissues, such as highly protein-bound insulin analogues designed for a prolonged, retarded insulin action. Most recently, aOFM has been used to sample agonists to study obesity, lipid metabolism and immune-inflammation. Applications of aOFM include ex vivo studies with tissue explants and preclinical and clinical in vivo studies.

=== Cerebral OFM (cOFM) ===
cOFM (Figure 5) is used to conduct PK/PD preclinical studies in the animal brain. Access to the brain includes monitoring of the blood–brain barrier function and drug transport across the intact blood–brain barrier. cOFM allows taking a look behind the blood–brain barrier and assesses concentrations and effects of neuroactive substances directly in the targeted brain tissue.

The blood–brain barrier is a natural shield that protects the brain and limits the exchange of nutrients, metabolites and chemical messengers between blood and brain. The blood–brain barrier also prevents potential harmful substances from entering and damaging the brain. However, this highly effective barrier also prevents neuroactive substances from reaching appropriate targets. For researchers that develop neuroactive drugs, it is therefore of major interest to know whether and to what extent an active pharmaceutical component can pass the blood–brain barrier. Experiments have shown that the blood–brain barrier has fully reestablished 15 days after implantation of the cOFM probe in the brain of rats. The cOFM probe has been specially designed to avoid a reopening of the blood–brain barrier or causing additional trauma to the brain after implantation. cOFM enables continuous sampling of cerebral ISF with intact blood–brain barrier cOFM and thus allows continuous PK monitoring in brain tissue.

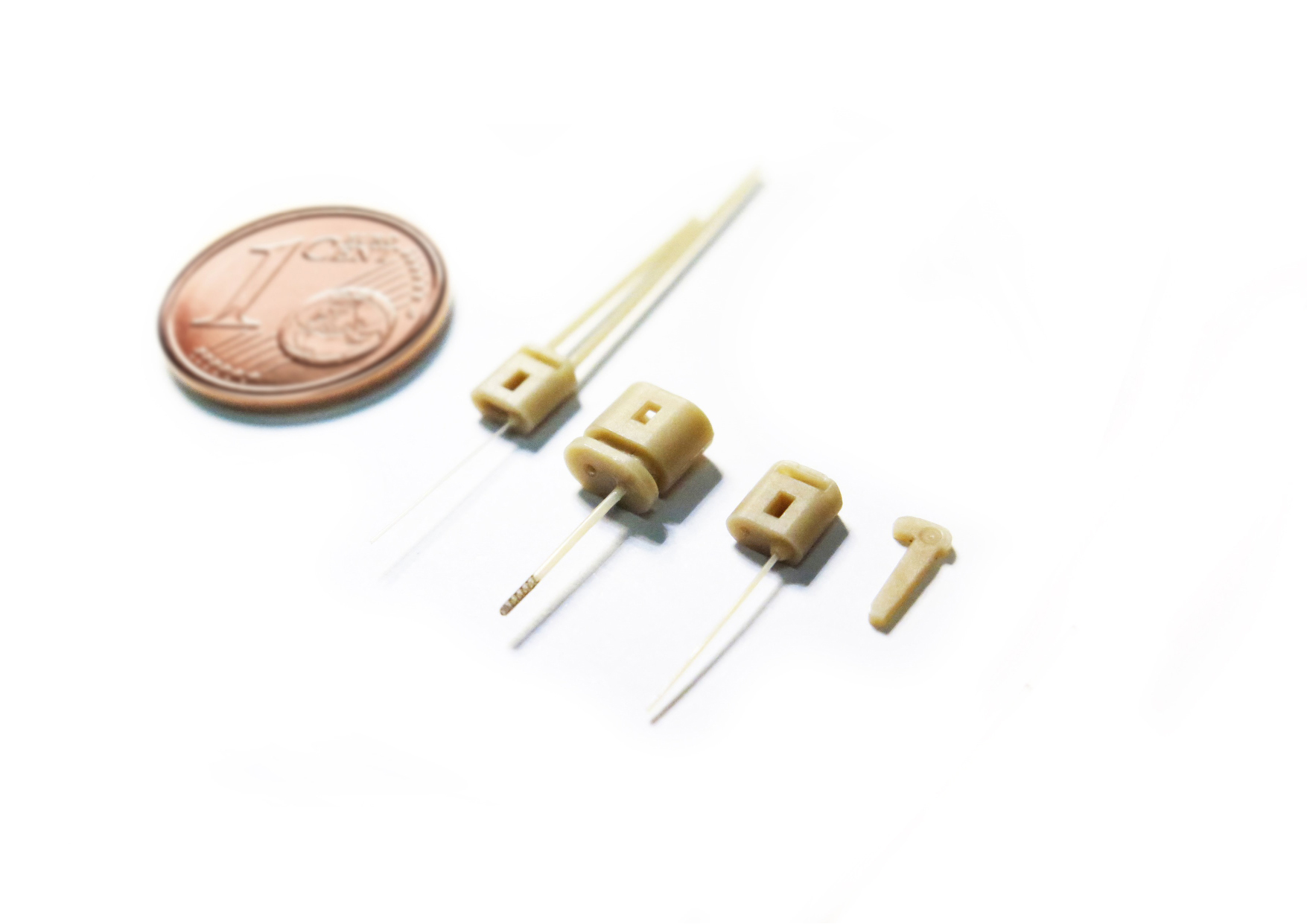
Figure 5: Concentric cOFM probe consisting of sampling insert, guide, healing dummy, and lock (from left to right)

=== Quantification of ISF compounds ===
ISF compounds can be quantified either indirectly from merely diluted ISF samples by using OFM and additional calibration techniques, or directly from undiluted ISF samples which can be collected with additional OFM methods. Quantification of compounds from diluted ISF samples requires additional application of calibration methods, such as Zero Flow Rate, No Net Flux or Ionic Reference. Zero Flow Rate has been used in combination with dOFM by Schaupp et al. to quantify potassium, sodium and glucose in adipose ISF samples. No Net Flux has been applied to quantify several analytes in OFM studies in subcutaneous adipose, muscle and dermal ISF: the absolute lactate concentrations and the absolute glucose concentrations in adipose ISF, the absolute albumin concentration in muscle ISF and the absolute insulin concentration in adipose and muscle ISF have been successfully determined. Dragatin et al. used No Net Flux in combination with dOFM to assess the absolute ISF concentration of a fully human therapeutic antibody. Ionic Reference has been used in combination with OFM to assess the absolute glucose concentration and the absolute lactate concentration in adipose ISF. Dermal OFM has also been used to quantify the concentrations of human insulin and an insulin analogue in the ISF with inulin as exogenous marker.

Additional OFM methods, such as OFM recirculation and OFM suction can collect undiluted ISF samples from which direct and absolute quantification of compounds is feasible. OFM recirculation to collect undiluted ISF samples recirculates the perfusate in a closed loop until equilibrium concentrations between perfusate and ISF are established. Using albumin as analyte, 20 recirculation cycles have been enough to reach equilibrium ISF concentrations. OFM suction is performed by applying a mild vacuum, which pulls ISF from the tissue into the OFM probe.
