= In vivo magnetic resonance spectroscopy =

Specialized technique associated with MRI

In vivo magnetic resonance spectroscopy (MRS) is a specialized technique associated with magnetic resonance imaging (MRI).

Magnetic resonance spectroscopy (MRS), also known as nuclear magnetic resonance (NMR) spectroscopy, is a non-invasive, ionizing-radiation-free analytical technique that has been used to study metabolic changes in brain tumors, strokes, seizure disorders, Alzheimer's disease, depression, and other diseases affecting the brain. It has also been used to study the metabolism of other organs such as muscles. In the case of muscles, NMR is used to measure the intramyocellular lipids content (IMCL).

Magnetic resonance spectroscopy is an analytical technique that can be used to complement the more common magnetic resonance imaging (MRI) in the characterization of tissue. Both techniques typically acquire signal from hydrogen protons (other endogenous nuclei such as those of Carbon, Nitrogen, and Phosphorus are also used), but MRI acquires signal primarily from protons which reside within water and fat, which are approximately a thousand times more abundant than the molecules detected with MRS. As a result, MRI often uses the larger available signal to produce very clean 2D images, whereas MRS very frequently only acquires signal from a single localized region, referred to as a "voxel". MRS can be used to determine the relative concentrations and physical properties of a variety of biochemicals frequently referred to as "metabolites" due to their role in metabolism.

== Data Acquisition ==
Acquiring an MRS scan is very similar to that of MRI with a few additional steps preceding data acquisition. These steps include:

1. Shimming the magnetic field: this step is taken to correct for the inhomogeneity of the magnetic field by tuning different pulses in the x, y, and z directions. This step is usually automated but can be performed manually.
2. Suppressing the water signal: because water molecules contain hydrogen, and the relative concentration of water to metabolite is about 10,000:1, the water signal is often suppressed or the metabolite peaks will not be discernible in the spectra. This is achieved by adding water suppression pulses. Recent advances allow proton MRS without water suppression.
3. Choosing a spectroscopic technique: careful planning of measurements is important in the context of a specific experiment.
  1. Single Voxel Spectroscopy (SVS): has a minimum spatial resolution of approximately 1 cm^{3}, and has the cleanest spectrum free from unwanted artifacts due to the small acquired volume leading to easy shim and less unwanted signals from outside the voxel.
  2. Magnetic Resonance Spectroscopic Imaging (MRSI): a 2-dimensional (or 3-dimensional) MRS technique which uses two/three phase-encoding directions to create a two/three-dimensional map of spectra. The drawbacks of this technique is that having two/three phase encoding directions requires lengthy scan time, and the larger volume of acquisition is more likely to introduce artefacts due to poorer shimming, unsuppressed water, as well as the inherent sinc point-spread-function due to the finite sampling of k-space which results in the signal from one voxel bleeding into all others.

== Data Quantification ==
During data acquisition, the scan acquires raw data in the form of spectra. This raw data must be quantified to achieve a meaningful understanding of the spectrum. This quantification is achieved via linear combination. Linear combination requires knowledge of the underlying spectral shapes, referred to as basis sets. Basis sets are acquired either via numerical simulation or experimentally measured in phantoms. There are numerous packages available to numerically simulate basis sets, including MARSS, FID-A, among others such as GAMMA, VESPA and Spinach. With the basis sets, the raw data can now be quantified as measured concentrations of different chemical species. Software is used to complete this. LCModel has been for most of the field's history the standard software quantification package, however it is no longer being actively developed. Other popular packages for quantification include: AMARES, AQSES, Gannet, INSPECTOR, jMRUI, Osprey, TARQUIN, and more.

Before linear combination, peak extraction used to be used for data quantification. However, this is no longer popular nor recommended. Peak extraction is a technique which integrates the area underneath a signal. Despite its seemingly straightforwardness, there are several confounds with this technique. Chiefly, the individual Lorentzian shapes employed do not scale up to match the complexity of the spectral shapes of J-coupled metabolites and is too simple to discern between overlapping peaks.. Also, critically, the Lorentzian lineshape has long tails

== Pulse Sequences ==
Similar to MRI, MRS uses pulse sequences to acquire signal from several different molecules to generate a spectra instead of an image. In MRS, STEAM (Stimulated Echo Acquisition Method) and PRESS (Point Resolved Spectroscopy) are the two primary pulse sequence techniques used. In terms of advantages, STEAM is best for imaging metabolites with shorter T2 and has lower SAR, while PRESS has higher SNR than STEAM. STEAM and PRESS are most widely used due to their implementation on the major vendors of MR scanners. Beyond STEAM and PRES there are sequences which utilize adiabatic pulses. Adiabatic pulses produce uniform flip angles even when there is extreme B_{1} inhomogeneity. Thus, these sequences allow us to achieve excitation that achieves the sought-for B_{1} insensitivity and off-resonance in the RF coil and sampled object. Specifically, adiabatic pulses solve the problem of signal dropout that comes from the different B_{1} flux patterns that result from the surface transmit coils used and the usage of normal pulses. Adiabatic pulses are also useful for constraints on RF peak power for excitation and lowering tissue heating. Additionally, adiabatic pulses have substantially higher bandwidth, which reduces chemical shift displacement artefact, which is particularly important at high field strengths and when a large range of frequencies are desired to be measured (i.e., measuring both the signals upfield and downfield of water in proton MRS).

=== Spatial Localization Sequences ===
In PRESS, the two chief drawbacks are lengthy echo time (TE) and chemical shift displacement (CSD) artifacts. Lengthy echo time arises from the fact that PRESS uses two 180° pulses, unlike STEAM which uses exclusively 90° pulses. The duration of 180° pulses are generally longer than 90° pulses because it takes more energy to flip a net magnetization vector completely as opposed to only 90°. Chemical shift displacement artifacts arises partly because of less optimal slice selection profiles. Multiple 180° pulses does not allow a very short TE, resulting in less optimal slice selection profile. Additionally, multiple 180° pulses means smaller bandwidth and thus larger chemical shift displacement. Specifically, the chemical shift displacement artifacts occur because signals with different chemical shifts experience different frequency-encoded slice selections and thus do not originate from same volume. Additionally, this effect becomes greater at higher magnetic field strengths.

SPECIAL consists of a spatially selective pre-excitation inversion pulse (typically AFP) followed by spatially selective excitation and refocusing pulses, both of which are usually SLR or truncated sinc pulses.

SPECIAL is a hybrid of PRESS and Image-Selected In Vivo Spectroscopy (ISIS). ISIS achieves spatial localization in the three spatial dimensions through a series of eight slice-selective preinversion pulses that can be appropriately positioned so that the sum of the eight cycles removes all signal outside the desired 3D region. SPECIAL obtains spatial localization from only a single dimension with pre-excitation inversion pulses (cycled on and off every other repetition time [TR]), making it a two-cycle sequence.

The use of the preinversion pulse to remove one refocusing pulse (as compared with PRESS) is what allows SPECIAL to achieve a short TE, reaching a minimum of 2.2 msec on a preclinical scanner in rat brain while being able to recover the full signal and as low as 6 msec on a clinical 3T scanner.

The largest drawback of SPECIAL and SPECIAL-sLASER is that they are two-cycle schemes, and systematic variations between cycles will manifest in their difference spectrum. Lipid contamination is a particularly large problem with SPECIAL and similar sequences.

The state-of-the-art localization sequence is sLASER, which utilizes two pairs of adiabatic refocusing pulses. This has recently been recommended by consensus.

The first is through OVS, which will reduce the contamination of lipid signals that originate from outside the voxel, although this comes at the cost of an increase in SAR. The second is not to set the amplitude of the pre-excitation inversion pulse to zero every other TR, but instead to shift the location of this ISIS plane such that the excited volume for the off condition is outside the object. This has been shown to greatly reduce lipid contamination, speculated to have arisen from the interaction between the RF pulse and lipid compartments due to incomplete relaxation, magnetization transfer, or the homonuclear Overhauser effect, although the exact mechanism remains unknown. The third is to use an echo-planar readout that dephases magnetization from outside the voxel, also shown to substantially reduce lipid artifacts. All three methods could be combined to overcome lipid contamination.

One of the dimensions to understand about a pulse sequence is its coherence pathway. The coherence pathway is the sequence of quantum coherence number(s) the signal takes prior to its acquisition. All coherence pathways end in -1, as this is the only coherence pathway detected by quadrature coils. The spin echo-type sequences (PRESS, sLASER, LASER) simply alternate between +1 and -1. For example, the coherence pathway for PRESS (expressed as a vector) is [-1, 1, -1]. This indicates that after the initial RF pulse (excitation pulse) the spins have a -1 quantum coherence. The refocusing pulses then swap the -1 to +1, then back from +1 to -1 (where it is then detected). Similarly for sLASER the coherence pathway is [-1, 1, -1, 1, -1]. The coherence pathway for LASER is [-1, 1, -1, 1, -1, 1, -1]. The coherence pathway for sPECIAL is [0, 1, -1]. This indicates that after the first RF pulse the signal resides as a population, due to its 0 quantum coherence number. Coherence pathways are critical as the explain how the sequences are affected by crushers and phase cycling. As such, coherence pathway analysis has been used to develop optimized crusher schemes and phase cycling schemes for an arbitrary MRS experiment.

== Uses ==
MRS allows doctors and researchers to obtain biochemical information about the tissues of the human body in a non-invasive way (without the need for a biopsy), whereas MRI only gives them information about the structure of the body (the distribution of water and fat).

For example, whereas MRI can be used to assist in the diagnosis of cancer, MRS could potentially be used to assist in information regarding to the aggressiveness of the tumor. Furthermore, because many pathologies appear similar in diagnostic imaging (such as radiation-induced necrosis and recurring tumor following radiotherapy), MRS may in the future be used to assist in distinguishing between similarly appearing prognoses.

MRS equipment can be tuned (just like a radio receiver) to pick up signals from different chemical nuclei within the body. The most common nuclei to be studied are protons (hydrogen), phosphorus, carbon, sodium and fluorine.

The types of biochemicals (metabolites) which can be studied include choline-containing compounds (which are used to make cell membranes), creatine (a chemical involved in energy metabolism), inositol and glucose (both sugars), N-acetylaspartate, and alanine and lactate which are elevated in some tumors.

At present MRS is mainly used as a tool by scientists (e.g. medical physicists and biochemists) for medical research projects, but it is becoming clear that it also has the ability to give doctors useful clinical information, especially with the discovery that it can be used to probe the concentration of alpha-Hydroxyglutaric acid, which is only present in IDH1 and IDH2 mutated gliomas, which alters the prescribed treatment regimen.

MRS is currently used to investigate a number of diseases in the human body, most notably cancer (in brain, breast and prostate), epilepsy, Alzheimer's disease, Parkinson's disease, and Huntington's chorea. MRS has been used to diagnose pituitary tuberculosis.

Prostate cancer: Combined with a magnetic resonance imaging (MRI) and given equal results, then the three-dimensional MRS can predict the prevalence of a malignant degeneration of prostate tissue by approximately 90%. The combination of both methods may be helpful in the planning of biopsies and therapies of the prostate, as well as to monitor the success of a therapy.

== Example ==
Shown below is an MRI brain scan (in the axial plane, that is slicing from front-to-back and side-to-side through the head) showing a brain tumor (meningioma) at the bottom right. The red box shows the volume of interest from which chemical information was obtained by MRS (a cube with 2 cm sides which produces a square when intersecting the 5 mm thick slice of the MRI scan).

Each biochemical, or metabolite, has a different peak in the spectrum which appears at a known frequency. The peaks corresponding to the amino acid alanine, are highlighted in red (at 1.4 ppm). This is an example of the kind of biochemical information which can help doctors to make their diagnosis. Other metabolites of note are choline (3.2 ppm) and creatine (3.0 ppm).

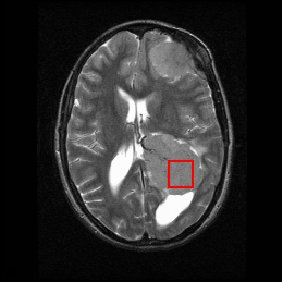
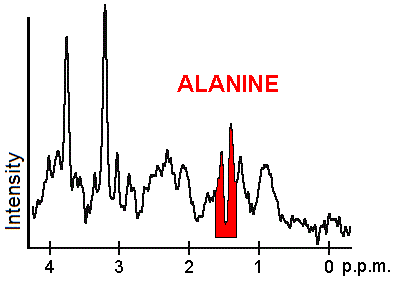

== Applications of MRS ==
Metabolite	Major Chemical Shift (ppm)	Function	in vivo MRS Applications	Clinical Applications
N-Acetyl Aspartate (NAA)	2.01	Osmoregulation; Precursor to neurotransmitter NAAG; Fatty acid and myelin synthesis (via storage form for acetyl groups)	Marker of neuronal density Concentration marker	Believed to reflect neuronal dysfunction rather than neuronal loss; Elevated levels seen in Canavan's syndrome and sickle cell disease in newborn infants and young children; Reduced levels seen in chronic stages of stroke, brain tumors, and multiple sclerosis
N-Acetyl Aspartyl Glutamate (NAAG)	2.04	Neurotransmitter involved in excitatory neurotransmission; Source of glutamate	Sum of NAA and NAAG provides a reliable estimate of NAA-containing molecules	None
Adenosine Triphosphate (ATP)	4.20 - 4.80, 6.13, 8.22	Principal donor of free energy in biological systems	Normally detected with ^{31}P NMR spectroscopy, more difficult to detect by ^{1}H NMR spectroscopy	Measure cerebral mitochondrial function
Alanine (Ala)	1.40	Linked to metabolic pathways like glycolysis, gluconeogensis, and TCA cycle	None	Elevated levels seen in melingomas
γ-aminobutyric acid (GABA)	3.00	Inhibitory neurotransmitter; Regulation of muscle tone	None	Reduced levels seen in recent seizures, schizophrenia, autism, bipolar disorder, major depressive disorder
Ascorbic Acid (Asc - Vitamin C)	4.49	Antioxidant; Coenzyme for the formation of collagen	Target for hyperpolarized ^{13}C applications to image the redox status in vivo	Measure ascorbic acid uptake
Aspartic Acid (Asc)	3.89	Excitatory neurotransmitter; Metabolite in urea cycle; Participates in gluconeogenesis; Essential to malate-aspartate shuttle	None	None
Carnitine	3.21	Transporting long-chain fatty acids across the mitochondrial membrane for β-oxidation; Regulatory role in substrate switching and glucose homeostasis	None	Direct correlation between carnitine content in seminal fluid and sperm count and mobility; Manage cardiac ischemia and peripheral arterial disease
Carnosine	7.09	Antioxidant; Increase Hayflick limit in fibroblasts; Reduce telomere shortening rate; Important intramuscular buffer	Noninvasive method to measure intracellular pH with ^{1}H NMR in vivo	Reduces development of atherosclerotic buildup
Choline-containing Compounds (tCho)	3.20	Involved in pathways of phospholipid synthesis and degradation	None	Elevated levels seen in cancer, Alzheimer's disease, and multiple sclerosis; Reduced levels are associated with liver disease and stroke
Citric Acid	2.57, 2.72	Intermediate of the Krebs cycle	None	Elevated levels in brain tumors; Diagnosis of malignant adenocarcinoma and benign prostatic hyperplasia
Creatine (Cr) and Phosphocreatine (PCr)	3.03	Energy buffer, retaining constant ATP levels through the creatine kinase reaction; Energy shuttle, diffusing from energy producing (i.e. mitochondria) to energy utilizing sites (i.e. myofibrils in muscle or nerve terminals in brain)	None	Reduced levels seen in chronic phases of many pathologies, including tumors and strokes
Deoxymyoglobin (DMb)	79.00	Oxygen storage compound and facilitator of oxygen diffusion	None	Elevated levels in ischemic conditions (i.e. heavy exercise, using a pressure cuff); Determine oxygen saturation in human skeletal and cardiac muscle
Glucose (Glc)	5.22	Ubiquitous source of energy from bacteria to humans; Broken down in TCA cycle to provide energy in form of ATP	Common target in ^{13}C applications to study metabolic pathways	Elevated levels in people with Alzheimer's
Glutamate (Glu)	2.20 - 2.40	Major excitatory neurotransmitter; Direct precursor for the major inhibitory neurotransmitter GABA; Important precursor to synthesis of glutathione; Glutamate-Glutamine neurotransmitter cycle	Separation between glutamate and glutamine becomes unreliable, although the sum (Glx) can be quantified with high accuracy	Elevated levels in bipolar disorder; Reduced levels in major depressive disorder
Glutamine (Gln)	2.20 - 2.40	Ammonia detoxification; Glutamate-Glutamine neurotransmitter cycle	Separation between glutamate and glutamine becomes unreliable, although the sum (Glx) can be quantified with high accuracy	Elevated levels during hyperammonemia; Good indicator of liver disease; Fuel source for a number of cancers
Glutathione (GSH)>	3.77	Antioxidant; Essential for maintaining normal red-blood-cell structure and keeping hemoglobin in ferrous state; Storage form of cysteine	None	Measure of cellular oxidative stress; Altered levels in Parkinson's disease and other neurodegenerative diseases affecting the basal ganglia
Glycerol	3.55, 3.64, 3.77	Major constituent of phospholipids	Difficult to observe in ^{1}H NMR spectra because of line broadening	None
Glycine	3.55	Inhibitory neurotransmitter; Forms significant fraction of collagen	None	Elevated levels in infants with hyperglycinemia and patients with brain tumors
Glycogen	3.83	Form of energy storage; Important role in systemic glucose metabolism	Routinely observed in ^{13}C NMR, but remains elusive in ^{1}H NMR	Altered levels in diabetes mellitus
Histidine	7.10, 7.80	Precursor for histamine and carnosine biosynthesis	Establish intracellular pH in ^{1}H NMR	Elevated levels in hepatic encephalopathy and histidinemia
Homocarnosine	7.10, 8.10, 3.00 - 4.50	Associated with epileptic seizure control	Good choice for in vivo pH monitoring Because of the overlap between GABA and Homocarnosine resonances, the GABA H-4 resonance at 3.01 ppm is the "total GABA" representing the sum of GABA and homocarnosine	Elevated levels seen in antiepileptic drugs, like gabapentin; Elevated levels in brain and CSF are associated with homocarnosinase
β-Hydroxybutyrate (BHB)	1.19	Alternate substrate for metabolism, typically under conditions of long fasting or high fat diets; Maintain acetoacetyl-CoA and acetyl-CoA for the synthesis of cholesterol, fatty acids, and complex lipids	None	Elevated levels believed to control seizures in childhood epilepsy
2-Hydroxyglutarate (2HG)	1.90	Oncometabolite (cancer-causing); Part of butanoate metabolic pathway	None	Elevated levels in gliomas
myo-Inositol (mI)	3.52	Exact function is unknown; Osmotic regulation in kidney; Biochemical relationship to messenger-inositol polyphosphate	None	Altered levels in patients with mild cognitive impairment, Alzheimer's disease, and brain injury
scyllo-Inositol (sI)	3.34	Reverse memory deficits; Reduce development of amyloid-beta (Aβ) plaques	None	Elevated levels during chronic alcoholism
Lactate (Lac)	1.31	End product of anaerobic glycolysis; Links astroglial glucose uptake and metabolism to neuronal neurotransmitter cycling in astroglial-neuronal lactate shuttle hypothesis (ANLS)	None	Elevated levels seen in hyperventilation, tumors, ischemic stroke, hypoxia
Lipids	0.9 - 1.5	Intramyocellular lipids represents a pool that displays active turnover and metabolism, for example, during exercise; Extramyocellular lipids represent an inert pool that lies between muscle fibers	High abundance of lipids is one of main reasons ^{1}H NMR outside the brain has seen limited applications	Elevated levels seen in necrosis
Macromolecules	0.93 (MM1), 1.24 (MM2), 1.43 (MM3), 1.72 (MM4), 2.05 (MM5), 2.29 (MM6), 3.00 (MM7), 3.20 (MM8), 3.8 - 4.0 (MM9), 4.3 (MM10)	Assignment to specific proteins is essentially impossible, but individual resonances can be assigned to amino acids; MM1: Leucine, Isoleucine, Valine; MM2 and MM3: Threonine and Alanine; MM4 and MM7: Lysine and Arginine; MM5 and MM6: Glutamate and Glutamine; MM8-MM10: Not very well defined to know	Significant fraction of observed signal is macromolecular resonances underlying the rest of metabolites Short T_{2} relaxation time constants effectively eliminate macromolecular resonances from long-echo-time ^{1}H NMR spectra Difference in T_{1} relaxations between metabolites and macromolecules is used to reduce contribution from extracranial lipid signal	Alternations in macromolecular spectrum observed in stroke, tumors, multiple sclerosis, and aging
Nicotinamid Adenine Dinucleotide (NAD^{+})	9.00	Coenzyme for electron-transfer enzymes; Substrate for ADP-ribose transferases, poly (ADP-ribose) polymerases, cADP-ribose synthases, and sirtuins; Involved in gene expression and repair, calcium mobilization, metabolism, aging, cancer, cell metabolism, and the timing of metabolism via the circadian rhythm	^{31}P NMR allows detection of both NAD^{+} and NADH, while ^{1}H NMR does not allow detection for NADH	None
Phenylalanine	7.30 - 7.45	Precursor for the amino acid tyrosine which is used for catchelcolamine (dopamine, epinephrine, and norepinephrine) synthesis	None	Elevated levels in phenylketonuria (PKU); Reduced levels in aging
Pyruvate	2.36	Converted into acetyl-coenzyme A; Participates in the anaplerotic reaction to replenish TCA cycle intermediates; Neuroprotective properties in stroke	Only FDA-approved compound for hyperpolarized ^{13}C NMR	Altered levels in cystic lesions and neonatal pyruvate dehydrogenase deficiency
Serine	3.80 - 4.00	Participates in biosynthesis of purines, pyridines, cysteine, glycine, 3-phosphoglycerate, and other proteins	None	Elevated levels in patients with Alzheimer's
Taurine (Tau)	3.25, 3.42	Exact function not known; Osmoregulator; Modulator of neurotransmitters	None	Reduced levels in aging
Threonine (Thr)	1.32	Precursor to glycine	None	Supplement to help alleviate anxiety and some cases of depression
Tryptophan (Trp)	7.20, 7.28	Necessary for production of serotonin, melatonin, vitamin B3 (niacin), and NAD^{+}	None	Elevated levels seen in hepatic encephalopathy; Treatment for mild insomnia; Antidepressant
Tyrosine (Tyr)	6.89 - 7.19	Precursor to the neurotransmitters epinephrine, norepinephrine, and dopamine as well as the thyroid hormones thyroxine and triiodothyronine; Converted to DOPA by tyrosine dehydroxylase; Key role in signal transduction	None	Elevated levels in hepatic encephalopathy; Reduced levels seen with aging
Water	4.80	Critical for homeostasis	Internal concentration referencing Water chemical shift used to detect temperature changes noninvasively in vivo	Water content only changes moderately with different pathologies

In ^{1}H Magnetic Resonance Spectroscopy each proton can be visualized at a specific chemical shift (peak position along x-axis) depending on its chemical environment. This chemical shift is dictated by neighboring protons within the molecule. Therefore, metabolites can be characterized by their unique set of ^{1}H chemical shifts. The metabolites that MRS probes for have known (^{1}H) chemical shifts that have previously been identified in NMR spectra. These metabolites include:

1. N-acetyl Aspartate (NAA): with its major resonance peak at 2.02 ppm, decrease in levels of NAA indicate loss or damage to neuronal tissue, which results from many types of insults to the brain. Its presence in normal conditions indicates neuronal and axonal integrity.
2. Choline: with its major peak at 3.2 ppm, choline is known to be associated with membrane turnover, or increase in cell division. Increased choline indicates increase in cell production or membrane breakdown, which can suggest demyelination or presence of malignant tumors.
3. Creatine and phosphocreatine: with its major peak at 3.0 ppm, creatine marks metabolism of brain energy. Gradual loss of creatine in conjunction with other major metabolites indicates tissue death or major cell death resulting from disease, injury or lack of blood supply. Increase in creatine concentration could be a response to cranialcerebral trauma. Absence of creatine may be indicative of a rare congenital disease.
4. Lipids: with their major aliphatic peaks located in the 0.9–1.5 ppm range, increase in lipids is seen is also indicative of necrosis. These spectra are easily contaminated, as lipids are not only present in the brain, but also in other biological tissue such as the fat in the scalp and area between the scalp and skull.
5. Lactate: Is an AX3 system which results in a doublet (two symmetric peaks) centered about 1.31 ppm, and a quartet (four peaks with relative peak heights of 1:2:2:1) centered about 4.10 ppm. The doublet at 1.31 ppm is typically quantified as the quartet may be suppressed through water saturation or obscured by residual water. In healthy subjects lactate is not visible, for its concentration is lower than the detection limit of MRS; however, presence of this peak indicates glycolysis has been initiated in an oxygen-deficient environment. Several causes of this include ischemia, hypoxia, mitochondrial disorders, and some types of tumors.
6. Myo-inositol: with its major peak at 3.56 ppm, an increase in Myo-inositol has been seen to be disrupted in patients with Alzheimer's, dementia, and HIV patients.
7. Glutamate and glutamine: these amino acids are marked by a series of resonance peaks between 2.2 and 2.4 ppm. Hyperammonemia, hepatic encephalopathy are two major conditions that result in elevated levels of glutamine and glutamate. MRS, used in conjunction with MRI or some other imaging technique, can be used to detect changes in the concentrations of these metabolites, or significantly abnormal concentrations of these metabolites.
8. GABA can be detected primarily from its peaks at approximately 3.0 ppm, however because creatine has a strong singlet at 3.0 ppm with approximately 20x the amplitude a technique which exploits J-coupling must be used to accurately quantify GABA. The most common techniques for this are J-difference editing (MEGA), or J-resolved (as used in JPRESS)
9. Glutathione can also be detected from its peak at peak at 3.0 ppm, however similar to GABA it also must use a method which exploits J-coupling to remove the overlaying creatine signal.

== Limitations of MRS ==
The major limitation to MRS is its low available signal due to the low concentration of metabolites as compared to water. As such, it has inherently poor temporal and spatial resolution. Nevertheless, no alternate technique is able to quantify metabolism in vivo non-invasively and thus MRS remains a valuable tool for research and clinical scientists.

In addition, despite recent efforts toward international expert consensus on methodological details like shimming, motion correction, spectral editing, spectroscopic neuroimaging, other advanced acquisition methods, data processing and quantification, application to brain, proton spectroscopy application to skeletal muscle, phosphorus application to skeletal muscle, methods description, results reporting, and other considerations, currently published implementations of in vivo magnetic resonance spectroscopy cluster into literatures exhibiting a broad variety of individualized acquisition, processing, quantification, and reporting techniques. This situation may contribute to a low sensitivity and specificity of, for example, in vivo proton magnetic resonance spectroscopy to disorders such as multiple sclerosis, that continue to fall below clinically beneficial thresholds for, e.g., diagnosis.

== Non-Proton (^{1}H) MRS ==
^{31}Phosphorus Magnetic Resonance Spectroscopy

^{1}H MRS's clinical success is only rivaled by ^{31}P MRS. This is in large part because of the relatively high sensitivity of phosphorus NMR (7% of protons) combined with a 100% natural abundance. Consequently, high-quality spectra are acquired within minutes. Even at low field strengths, great spectra resolution is obtained because of the relatively large (~30 ppm) chemical shift dispersion for in vivo phosphates. Clinically, phosphorus NMR excels because it detects all metabolites playing key roles in tissue energy metabolism and can indirectly deduce intracellular pH. However, phosphorus NMR is chiefly challenged by the limited number of metabolites it can detect.

^{13}Carbon Magnetic Resonance Spectroscopy

In contrast to phosphorus NMR, carbon NMR is an insensitive technique. This arises from the fact that ^{13}C NMR has a low abundance (1.1%) and carbon's low gyromagnetic ratio. This low abundance is because ^{12}C does not have a magnetic moment, making it not NMR active, leading to ^{13}C's use for spectroscopy purposes. However, this low sensitivity can be improved via decoupling, averaging, polarization transfer, and larger volumes. Despite the low natural abundance and sensitivity of ^{13}C, ^{13}C MRS has been used to study several metabolites, especially glycogen and triglycerides. It has proven especially useful at providing insight on the metabolic fluxes from ^{13}C-labeled precursors. There is great overlap in what ^{1}H MRS and ^{13}C MRS can obtain spectra-wise and large reason, combined with ^{1}H MRS's high sensitivity, why ^{13}C MRS has never seen wide application like ^{1}H MRS. See also Hyperpolarized carbon-13 MRI.

^{23}Sodium Magnetic Resonance Spectroscopy

Sodium NMR is infamous for its low sensitivity (9.2% relative to proton sensitivity) and low SNR because of its low sodium concentration (30 - 100 mM), especially compared to protons (40 - 50 M). However, interest in sodium NMR has been reinspired by recent significant gains in SNR at high magnetic fields, along with improved coil designs and optimized pulse sequences. There is much hope for sodium NMR's clinical potential because the detection of abnormal intracellular sodium in vivo may have significant diagnostic potential and reveal new insights into tissue electrolysis homeostasis.

^{19}Fluorine Magnetic Resonance Spectroscopy

Fluorine NMR has high sensitivity (82% relative to proton sensitivity) and 100% natural abundance. However, no endogenous ^{19}F containing compounds are found in biological tissues and thus the fluorine signal comes from an external reference compound. Because^{19}F is not found in biological tissues, ^{19}F does not have to deal with interference from background signals like in vivo ^{1}H MRS does with water, making it especially powerful for pharmacokinetic studies. ^{1}H MRI provides the anatomical landmarks, while ^{19}F MRI/MRS allows us to follow and map the specific interactions of specific compounds. in vivo ^{19}F MRS can be used to monitor the uptake and metabolism of drugs, study the metabolism of anesthetic, determine cerebral blood flow, and measure, via fluorinated compounds ("probes"), various parameters like pH, oxygen levels, and metal concentration.

== See also ==
- Functional magnetic resonance spectroscopy of the brain
- Magnetic resonance imaging
- Magnetization transfer
- NMR
- NMR spectroscopy
