= Quantum mechanics of nuclear magnetic resonance spectroscopy =

Theory of NMR spectroscopy based on Quantum mechanics

Nuclear magnetic resonance (NMR) spectroscopy uses the intrinsic magnetic moment that arises from the spin angular momentum of a spin-active nucleus. If the element of interest has a nuclear spin that is not 0, the nucleus may exist in different spin angular momentum states, where the energy of these states can be affected by an external magnetic field. For a spin $I = \frac{1}{2}$ nucleus, there are two spin states of consideration: spin up and spin down. The presence of an external magnetic field causes the two states to separate in energy, with the relative ordering depending on the gyromagnetic ratio of the nucleus. The sample's bulk magnetization, that is, the sum of the total magnetic moments of all nuclei in the sample, will determine the strength of the NMR signal. In addition, the energy of the applied radio frequency used in NMR must be consistent with the energy difference between the spin states.

== Eigenvalues of nuclear spin states ==
The Hamiltonian operator corresponds with the total energy of a quantum system. The Hamiltonian for a single spin 1/2 nucleus in the presence of an applied magnetic field $B_0$ aligned along the z axis is

$$\hat{H} = - \gamma B_0 \hat{I}_z$$

where $\gamma$ is the gyromagnetic ratio and $\hat{I}_z$ is the z-component of the nuclear spin angular momentum. Denoting $| \alpha \rangle$ the spin state with $m_s = +\frac{1}{2}$ and $| \beta \rangle$ the spin state with $m_s = - \frac{1}{2}$, the eigenvalues of the Hamiltonian are

$$\hat{H} | \alpha \rangle = - \frac{1}{2} \gamma \hbar B_0 | \alpha \rangle , \quad \hat{H} | \beta \rangle = + \frac{1}{2} \gamma \hbar B_0 | \beta \rangle$$

We can see that the ordering of energies for the two states depends on the gyromagnetic ratio of the nucleus. For example, for $^1 \textrm{H}$ nuclei ($\gamma = 2.675 \times 10^8$ s ^{-1} T ^{-1}) the $| \alpha \rangle$ states are lower in energy than $| \beta \rangle$, whereas the situation is reversed for $^{15} \textrm{N}$ ($\gamma = -2.711 \times 10^7$ s ^{-1} T ^{-1} ).

== Two spins without coupling ==
If there are two spin states, then we have to change the Hamiltonian in such a way that it accommodates both the spin states.

Ĥ_{two spins, no coupling} = v_{0,1}Î_{1Z} + v_{0,2}Î_{2Z}

v_{0,1} is the Larmor frequency of first spin and v_{0,2} is the Larmor frequency of second spin. Similarly Î_{1Z} is the z-component of angular momentum operator of first spin and Î_{2Z} is the z-component of angular momentum operator of first spin. Here in this case coupling is not considered. Here while considering the wave function we have to look into both spin states of both spin 1 and 2. The spin up state is represented by α and spin down is β. The wave functions hence will have four combinations as below. ψ_{α,1} ψ_{α,2} = αα ψ_{α,1} ψ_{β,2} = αβ ψ_{β,1} ψ_{α,2} = βα ψ_{β,1} ψ_{β,2} = ββ Applying these combinations into the two spin Hamiltonian above will give the eigenvalue which is the energy state. This is tabulated below.

Spin states	Eigenfunction	Eigenvalue (energy)
αα	ψ_{α,1} ψ_{α,2}	+(1/2)v_{0,1} + (1/2)v_{0,2}
αβ	ψ_{α,1} ψ_{β,2}	+(1/2)v_{0,1} - (1/2)v_{0,2}
βα	ψ_{β,1} ψ_{α,2}	-(1/2)v_{0,1} + (1/2)v_{0,2}
ββ	ψ_{β,1} ψ_{β,2}	-(1/2)v_{0,1} - (1/2)v_{0,2}

In general, the energy level (eigenvalue) can be written as;

E_{m} = m_{1}v_{0,1} + m_{2}v_{0,2}

== Eigenvalues of coupled spins ==
To consider coupling of spin 1 and 2 a coupling constant (J) and corresponding coupling term is introduced in the Hamiltonian:

Ĥ_{two spins} = v_{0,1}Î_{1Z} + v_{0,2}Î_{2Z} + J_{12}Î_{1Z}Î_{2Z}

Applying the wave functions in this Hamiltonian gives the eigenvalues as tabulated below.

Number	Spin states	Eigenfunction	Eigenvalue (energy)
1	αα	ψ_{α,1} ψ_{α,2}	+(1/2)v_{0,1} + (1/2)v_{0,2} + (1/4)J_{12}
2	αβ	ψ_{α,1} ψ_{β,2}	+(1/2)v_{0,1} - (1/2)v_{0,2} - (1/4)J_{12}
3	βα	ψ_{β,1} ψ_{α,2}	-(1/2)v_{0,1} + (1/2)v_{0,2} - (1/4)J_{12}
4	ββ	ψ_{β,1} ψ_{β,2}	-(1/2)v_{0,1} - (1/2)v_{0,2} + (1/4)J_{12}

== Selection rule and transitions ==
When two spins couple each other, the Hamiltonian operator will be,

Ĥ_{two spins} = v_{0,1}Î_{1Z} + v_{0,2}Î_{2Z} + J_{12}Î_{1Z}Î_{2Z}

The eigenvalue,

E_{m} = m_{1}v_{0,1} + m_{2}v_{0,2} + m_{1}m_{2} J_{12}

The selection rule for allowed transition is + or -1. Here we are considering homonuclear protons. Thus their αβ and βα states will have the same energy. The transition energy can be calculated by reducing the energy (eigenvalue) of the upper state from the lower state. The transition energy in frequency units is tabulated below.

Transitions	Spin states	Frequency
1 to 2	αα to αβ	-v_{0,2} - (1/2)J_{12}
3 to 4	βα to ββ	-v_{0,2} + (1/2)J_{12}
1 to 3	αα to βα	-v_{0,1} - (1/2)J_{12}
2 to 4	αβ to ββ	-v_{0,1} + (1/2)J_{12}

The transitions given in the above table is represented in the figure below:

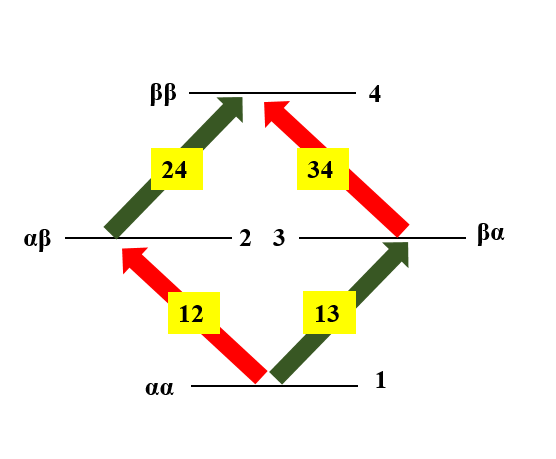
Possible transitions in the energy levels of two coupled nuclei (spin half) during nuclear magnetic resonance is depicted in the figure.

Relevance in Nuclear Magnetic Resonance (NMR):

In NMR, the nuclear spin angular momentum interacts with an external magnetic field. The splitting of energy levels due to mI (known as Zeeman splitting) forms the basis of NMR spectroscopy.

The transitions between these quantised levels are detected as resonance frequencies.
