= Microdialysis =

Biological fluid sampling technique

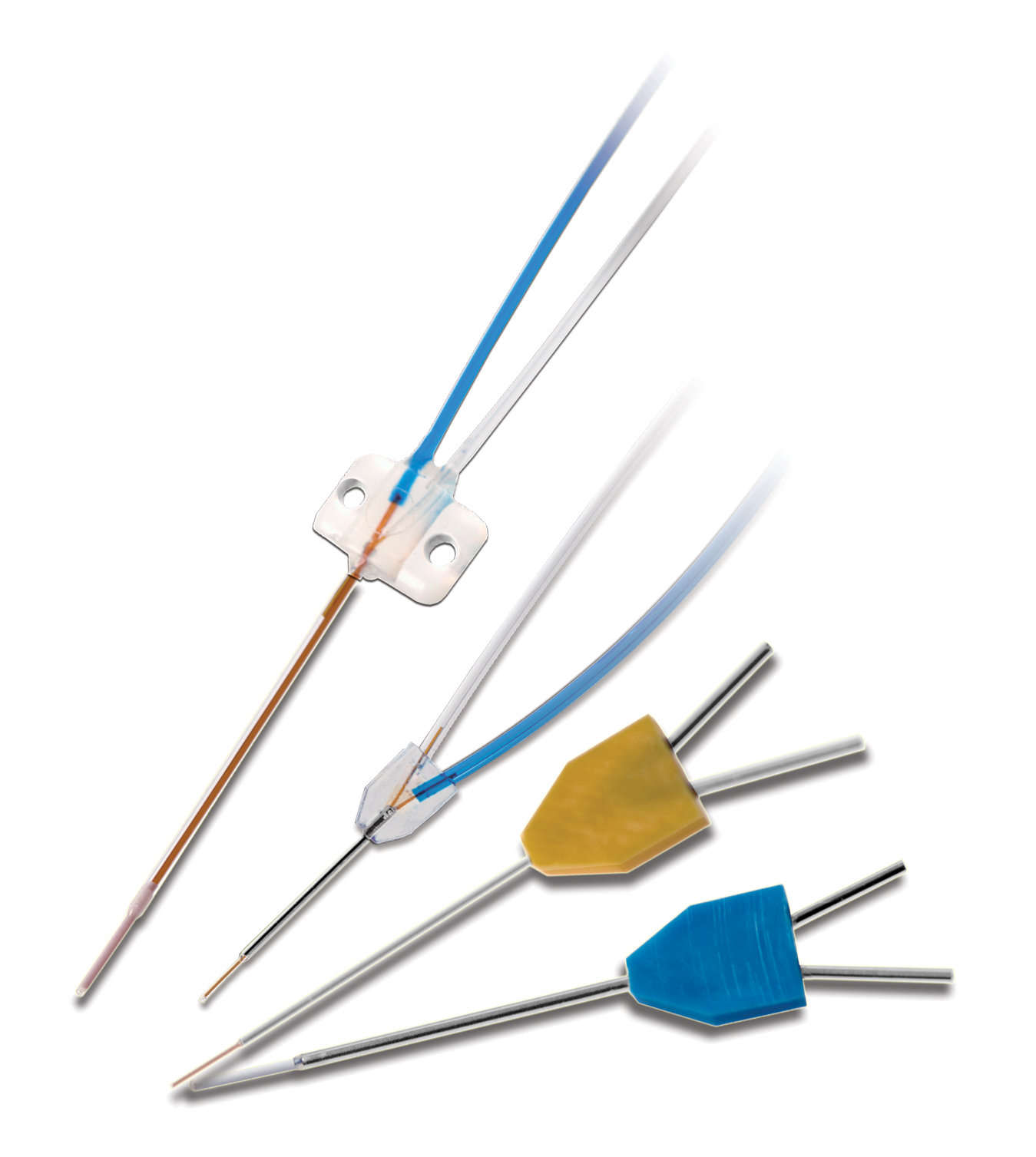
Microdialysis probes manufactured by CMA Microdialysis AB, Kista, Sweden

Microdialysis is a minimally-invasive sampling technique that is used for continuous measurement of free, unbound analyte concentrations in the extracellular fluid of virtually any tissue. Analytes may include endogenous molecules (e.g. neurotransmitter, hormones, glucose, etc.) to assess their biochemical functions in the body, or exogenous compounds (e.g. pharmaceuticals) to determine their distribution within the body. The microdialysis technique requires the insertion of a small microdialysis catheter (also referred to as microdialysis probe) into the tissue of interest. The microdialysis probe is designed to mimic a blood capillary and consists of a shaft with a semipermeable hollow fiber membrane at its tip, which is connected to inlet and outlet tubing. The probe is continuously perfused with an aqueous solution (perfusate) that closely resembles the (ionic) composition of the surrounding tissue fluid at a low flow rate of approximately 0.1-5μL/min. Once inserted into the tissue or (body)fluid of interest, small solutes can cross the semipermeable membrane by passive diffusion. The direction of the analyte flow is determined by the respective concentration gradient and allows the usage of microdialysis probes as sampling as well as delivery tools. The solution leaving the probe (dialysate) is collected at certain time intervals for analysis.

== History ==
The microdialysis principle was first employed in the early 1960s, when push-pull canulas and dialysis sacs were implanted into animal tissues, especially into rodent brains, to directly study the tissues' biochemistry. While these techniques had a number of experimental drawbacks, such as the number of samples per animal or no/limited time resolution, the invention of continuously perfused dialytrodes in 1972 helped to overcome some of these limitations. Further improvement of the dialytrode concept resulted in the invention of the "hollow fiber", a tubular semipermeable membrane with a diameter of ~200-300μm, in 1974. Today's most prevalent shape, the needle probe, consists of a shaft with a hollow fiber at its tip and can be inserted by means of a guide cannula into the brain and other tissues. An alternative method, open flow micro-perfusion (OFM), replaces the membrane with macroscopic openings which facilitates sampling of lipophilic and hydrophilic compounds, protein bound and unbound drugs, neurotransmitters, peptides and proteins, antibodies, nanoparticles and nanocarriers, enzymes and vesicles.

== Microdialysis probes ==
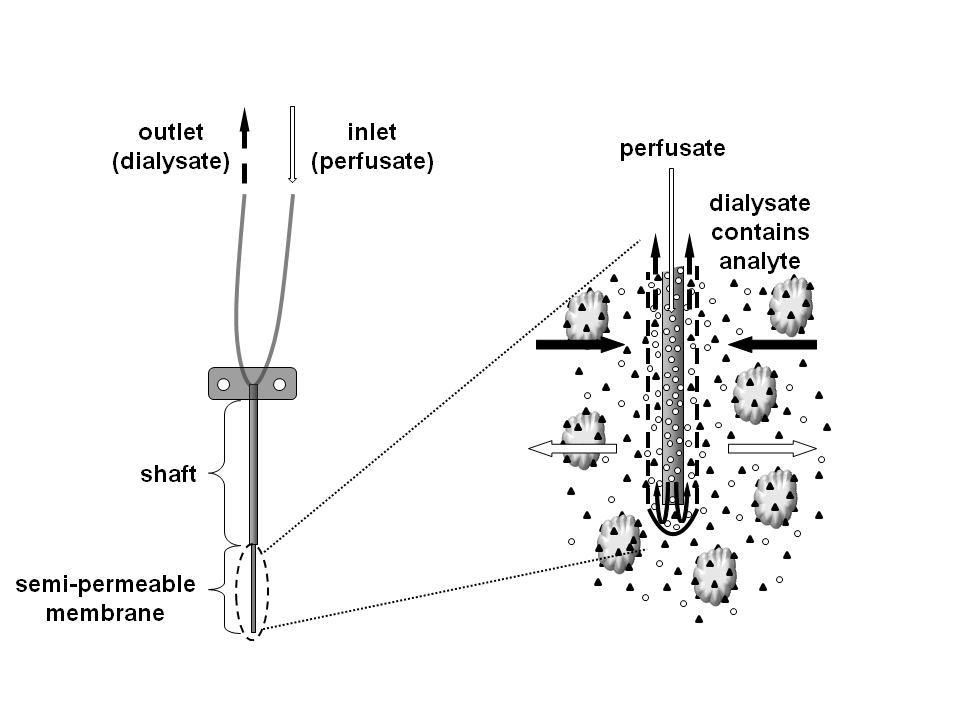
Schematic illustration of a microdialysis probe

There are a variety of probes with different membrane and shaft length combinations available. The molecular weight cutoff of commercially available microdialysis probes covers a wide range of approximately 6–100kD, but also 1MD is available. While water-soluble compounds generally diffuse freely across the microdialysis membrane, the situation is not as clear for highly lipophilic analytes, where both successful (e.g. corticosteroids) and unsuccessful microdialysis experiments (e.g. estradiol, fusidic acid) have been reported. However, the recovery of water-soluble compounds usually decreases rapidly if the molecular weight of the analyte exceeds 25% of the membrane’s molecular weight cutoff.

== Recovery and calibration methods ==
Due to the constant perfusion of the microdialysis probe with fresh perfusate, a total equilibrium cannot be established. This results in dialysate concentrations that are lower than those measured at the distant sampling site. In order to correlate concentrations measured in the dialysate with those present at the distant sampling site, a calibration factor (recovery) is needed. The recovery can be determined at steady-state using the constant rate of analyte exchange across the microdialysis membrane. The rate at which an analyte is exchanged across the semipermeable membrane is generally expressed as the analyte’s extraction efficiency. The extraction efficiency is defined as the ratio between the loss/gain of analyte during its passage through the probe (C_{in}−C_{out}) and the difference in concentration between perfusate and distant sampling site (C_{in}−C_{sample}).

In theory, the extraction efficiency of a microdialysis probe can be determined by: 1) changing the drug concentrations while keeping the flow rate constant or 2) changing the flow rate while keeping the respective drug concentrations constant. At steady-state, the same extraction efficiency value is obtained, no matter if the analyte is enriched or depleted in the perfusate. Microdialysis probes can consequently be calibrated by either measuring the loss of analyte using drug-containing perfusate or the gain of analyte using drug-containing sample solutions. To date, the most frequently used calibration methods are the low-flow-rate method, the no-net-flux method, the dynamic (extended) no-net-flux method, and the retrodialysis method. The proper selection of an appropriate calibration method is critically important for the success of a microdialysis experiment. Supportive in vitro experiments prior to the use in animals or humans are therefore recommended. In addition, the recovery determined in vitro may differ from the recovery in humans. Its actual value therefore needs to be determined in every in vivo experiment.

=== Low-flow-rate method ===
The low-flow-rate method is based on the fact that the extraction efficiency is dependent on the flow-rate. At high flow-rates, the amount of drug diffusing from the sampling site into the dialysate per unit time is smaller (low extraction efficiency) than at lower flow-rates (high extraction efficiency). At a flow-rate of zero, a total equilibrium between these two sites is established (C_{out} = C_{sample}). This concept is applied for the (low-)flow-rate method, where the probe is perfused with blank perfusate at different flow-rates. Concentration at the sampling site can be determined by plotting the extraction ratios against the corresponding flow-rates and extrapolating to zero-flow. The low-flow-rate method is limited by the fact that calibration times may be rather long before a sufficient sample volume has been collected.

=== No-net-flux-method ===
During calibration with the no-net-flux-method, the microdialysis probe is perfused with at least four different concentrations of the analyte of interest (C_{in}) and steady-state concentrations of the analyte leaving the probe are measured in the dialysate (C_{out}). The recovery for this method can be determined by plotting C_{out}−C_{in} over C_{in} and computing the slope of the regression line. If analyte concentrations in the perfusate are equal to concentrations at the sampling site, no-net flux occurs. Respective concentrations at the no-net-flux point are represented by the x-intercept of the regression line. The strength of this method is that, at steady-state, no assumptions about the behaviour of the compound in the vicinity of the probe have to be made, since equilibrium exists at a specific time and place. However, under transient conditions (e.g. after drug challenge), the probe recovery may be altered resulting in biased estimates of the concentrations at the sampling site. To overcome this limitation, several approaches have been developed that are also applicable under non-steady-state conditions. One of these approaches is the dynamic no-net-flux method.

=== Dynamic no-net-flux method ===
While a single subject/animal is perfused with multiple concentrations during the no-net-flux method, multiple subjects are perfused with a single concentration during the dynamic no-net-flux (DNNF) method. Data from the different subjects/animals is then combined at each time point for regression analysis allowing determination of the recovery over time. The design of the DNNF calibration method has proven very useful for studies that evaluate the response of endogenous compounds, such as neurotransmitters, to drug challenge.

=== Retrodialysis ===
During retrodialysis, the microdialysis probe is perfused with an analyte-containing solution and the disappearance of drug from the probe is monitored. The recovery for this method can be computed as the ratio of drug lost during passage (C_{in}−C_{out}) and drug entering the microdialysis probe (C_{in}). In principle, retrodialysis can be performed using either the analyte itself (retrodialysis by drug) or a reference compound (retrodialysis by calibrator) that closely resembles both the physiochemical and the biological properties of the analyte. Despite the fact that retrodialysis by drug cannot be used for endogenous compounds as it requires absence of analyte from the sampling site, this calibration method is most commonly used for exogenous compounds in clinical settings.

== Applications ==
The microdialysis technique has undergone much development since its first use in 1972, when it was first employed to monitor concentrations of endogenous biomolecules in the brain. Today's area of application has expanded to monitoring free concentrations of endogenous as well as exogenous compounds in virtually any tissue. Although microdialysis is still primarily used in preclinical animal studies (e.g. laboratory rodents, dogs, sheep, pigs), it is now increasingly employed in humans to monitor free, unbound drug tissue concentrations as well as interstitial concentrations of regulatory cytokines and metabolites in response to homeostatic perturbations such as feeding and/or exercise.

When employed in brain research, microdialysis is commonly used to measure neurotransmitters (e.g. dopamine, serotonin, norepinephrine, acetylcholine, glutamate, GABA) and their metabolites, as well as small neuromodulators (e.g. cAMP, cGMP, NO), amino acids (e.g. glycine, cysteine, tyrosine), and energy substrates (e.g. glucose, lactate, pyruvate). Exogenous drugs to be analyzed by microdialysis include new antidepressants, antipsychotics, as well as antibiotics and many other drugs that have their pharmacological effect site in the brain. The first non-metabolite to be analyzed by microdialysis in vivo in the human brain was rifampicin.

Applications in other organs include the skin (assessment of bioavailability and bioequivalence of topically applied dermatological drug products), and monitoring of glucose concentrations in patients with diabetes (intravascular or subcutaneous probe placement). The latter may even be incorporated into an artificial pancreas system for automated insulin administration.

Microdialysis has also found increasing application in environmental research, sampling a diversity of compounds from waste-water and soil solution, including saccharides, metal ions, micronutrients, organic acids, and low molecular weight nitrogen. Given the destructive nature of conventional soil sampling methods, microdialysis has potential to estimate fluxes of soil ions that better reflect an undisturbed soil environment.

== Critical analysis ==
=== Advantages ===
1. To date, microdialysis is the only in vivo sampling technique that can continuously monitor drug or metabolite concentrations in the extracellular fluid of virtually any tissue. Depending on the exact application, analyte concentrations can be monitored over several hours, days, or even weeks. Free, unbound extracellular tissue concentrations are in many cases of particular interest as they resemble pharmacologically active concentrations at or close to the site of action. Combination of microdialysis with modern imaging techniques, such positron emission tomography, further allow for determination of intracellular concentrations.
2. Insertion of the probe in a precise location of the selected tissue further allows for evaluation of extracellular concentration gradients due to transporter activity or other factors, such as perfusion differences. It has, therefore, been suggested as the most appropriate technique to be used for tissue distribution studies.
3. Exchange of analyte across the semipermeable membrane and constant replacement of the sampling fluid with fresh perfusate prevents drainage of fluid from the sampling site, which allows sampling without fluid loss. Microdialysis can consequently be used without disturbing the tissue conditions by local fluid loss or pressure artifacts, which can occur when using other techniques, such as microinjection or push-pull perfusion.
4. The semipermeable membrane prevents cells, cellular debris, and proteins from entering into the dialysate. Due to the lack of protein in the dialysate, a sample clean-up prior to analysis is not needed and enzymatic degradation is not a concern.

=== Limitations ===
1. Despite scientific advances in making microdialysis probes smaller and more efficient, the invasive nature of this technique still poses some practical and ethical limitations. For example, it has been shown that implantation of a microdialysis probe can alter tissue morphology resulting in disturbed microcirculation, rate of metabolism or integrity of physiological barriers, such as the blood–brain barrier. While acute reactions to probe insertion, such as implantation traumas, require sufficient recovery time, additional factors, such as necrosis, inflammatory responses, or wound healing processes have to be taken into consideration for long-term sampling as they may influence the experimental outcome. From a practical perspective, it has been suggested to perform microdialysis experiments within an optimal time window, usually 24–48 hours after probe insertion.
2. Microdialysis has a relatively low temporal and spatial resolution compared to, for example, electrochemical biosensors. While the temporal resolution is determined by the length of the sampling intervals (usually a few minutes), the spatial resolution is determined by the dimensions of the probe. The probe size can vary between different areas of application and covers a range of a few millimeters (intracerebral application) up to a few centimeters (subcutaneous application) in length and a few hundred micrometers in diameter.
3. Application of the microdialysis technique is often limited by the determination of the probe’s recovery, especially for in vivo experiments. Determination of the recovery may be time-consuming and may require additional subjects or pilot experiments. The recovery is largely dependent on the flow rate: the lower the flow rate, the higher the recovery. However, in practice the flow rate cannot be decreased too much since either the sample volume obtained for analysis will be insufficient or the temporal resolution of the experiment will be lost. It is therefore important to optimize the relationship between flow rate and the sensitivity of the analytical assay. The situation may be more complex for lipophilic compounds as they can stick to the tubing or other probe components, resulting in a low or no analyte recovery.
