= Metabolite pool =

Collective term for all of the substances involved in the metabolic process

Metabolite pool is a collective term for all of the substances involved in the metabolic process in a biological system. Metabolic pools are within cells (or organelles such as chloroplasts) and refer to the reservoir of molecules upon which enzymes can operate. The size of the reservoir is referred to as its "metabolic pool." The metabolic pool concept is important to cellular biology.

In certain ways, a metabolic pathway is similar to a factory assembly line. Products are assembled from parts by workers who each perform a specific step in the manufacturing process. Enzymes of a cell are like workers on an assembly line; each is only responsible for a particular step in the assembly process. A lag period also occurs when a new factory is constructed, a time period before finished products begin to roll off the assembly line at a steady rate. This lag period partially results from the time needed to fill supply bins with the necessary parts. As you might imagine, when parts are not readily available, production slows or stops. Metabolite pools are somewhat analogous to the parts bins of a factory. The Calvin-Benson cycle will only operate at full speed when the cellular 'bins' are full of the molecular building blocks that lie between PGA and RUBP.
