= Push–pull perfusion =

In vivo sampling method

Push–pull perfusion is an in vivo sampling method most commonly used for measuring neurotransmitters in the brain. Developed by J.H. Gaddum in 1960, this technique replaced the cortical cup technique for observing neurotransmitters.

In order to analyze concentrations of analytes such as neurotransmitters, a probe consisting of two concentric tubes is implanted in the region of interest. A pump then pushes a neutral fluid such as saline or Ringer's solution through one of the tubes, while another pump extracts the fluid through the other tube. While outside the tubes, the perfusion fluid picks up physiological substances such as neurotransmitters that are present in the area. The concentration of analytes of interest can then be measured in the expelled fluid, indicating in which concentration they are present at the site of interest at any given time.

The advent of concentric microdialysis probes in the 1980s resulted in push-pull sampling falling out of favor, as such probes require less monitoring, and are less invasive than the higher flow rate push-pull probes (>10 microliter/min), which could result in lesions if flow is unbalanced.

With the advent of microfluidics and miniaturized probes, low-flow push–pull sampling was developed in 2002. By using flow rates of ~50 nL/min, this technique minimizes tissue damage while providing finer spatial resolution than microdialysis sampling.
