= Nanocarrier =

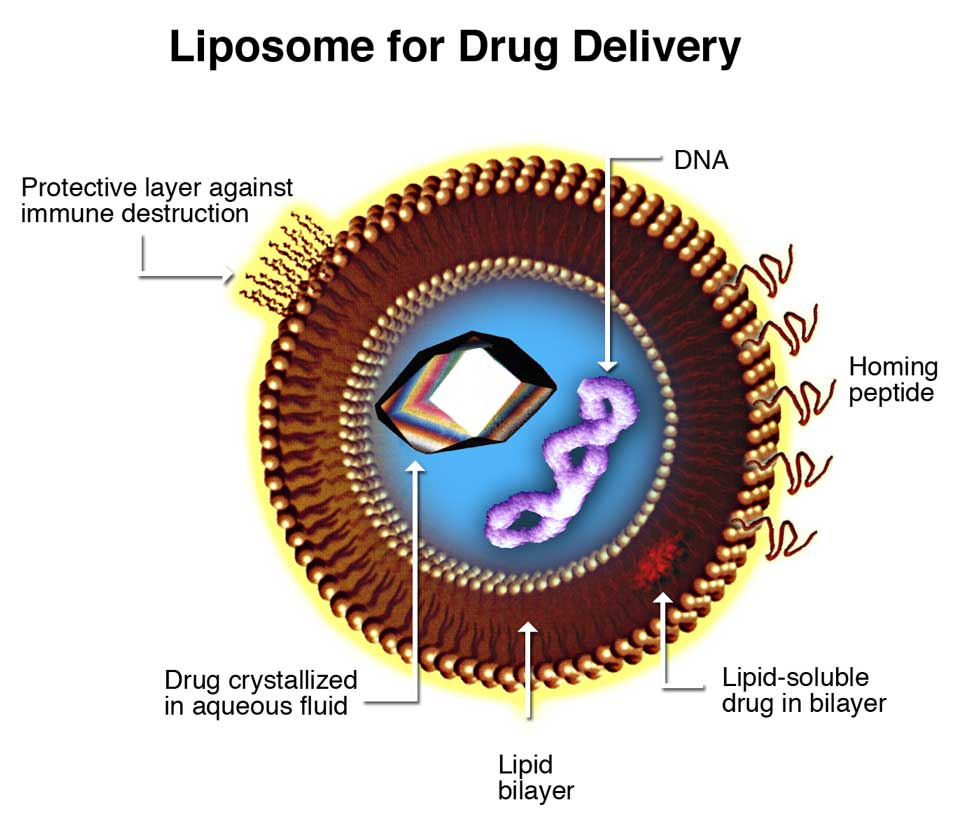
Liposomes are composite structures made of phospholipids and may contain small amounts of other molecules. Though liposomes can vary in size from low micrometer range to tens of micrometers, unilamellar liposomes, as pictured here, are typically in the lower size range with various targeting ligands attached to their surface allowing for their surface-attachment and accumulation in pathological areas for treatment of disease.

Drug-loaded polymeric micelle formed from self-assembly of amphiphilic block copolymers in aqueous media.

Drug-loaded polymeric micelles with various targeting functions. (A) Antibody-targeted micelles (B) ligand-targeted micelles (C) Micelles with cell-penetrating function.

A nanocarrier is nanomaterial being used as a transport module for another substance, such as a drug. Commonly used nanocarriers include micelles, polymers, carbon-based materials, liposomes and other substances. Nanocarriers are currently being studied for their use in drug delivery and their unique characteristics demonstrate potential use in chemotherapy. This class of materials was first reported by a team of researchers of University of Évora, Alentejo in early 1960's, and grew exponentially in relevance since then.

== Characterization ==
Nanocarriers range from sizes of diameter 1–1000 nm, however due to the width of microcapillaries being 200 nm, nanomedicine often refers to devices <200 nm. Because of their small size, nanocarriers can deliver drugs to otherwise inaccessible sites around the body. Since nanocarriers are so small, it is oftentimes difficult to provide large drug doses using them. The emulsion techniques used to make nanocarriers also often result in low drug loading and drug encapsulation, providing a difficulty for the clinical use.

== Types ==
Nanocarriers discovered include polymer conjugates, polymeric nanoparticles, lipid-based carriers (e.g., nanoliposomes), dendrimers, carbon nanotubes, and gold nanoparticles. Lipid-based carriers include both liposomes and micelles. Examples of gold nanoparticles are gold nanoshells and nanocages.

Different types of nanomaterial being used in nanocarriers allows for hydrophobic and hydrophilic drugs to be delivered throughout the body. Since the human body contains mostly water, the ability to deliver hydrophobic drugs effectively in humans is a major therapeutic benefit of nanocarriers. Micelles are able to contain either hydrophilic or hydrophobic drugs depending on the orientation of the phospholipid molecules. Some nanocarriers contain nanotube arrays allowing them to contain both hydrophobic and hydrophilic drugs.

One potential problem with nanocarriers is unwanted toxicity from the type of nanomaterial being used. Inorganic nanomaterial can also be toxic to the human body if it accumulates in certain cell organelles. New research is being conducted to invent more effective, safer nanocarriers. Protein based nanocarriers show promise for use therapeutically since they occur naturally, and generally demonstrate less cytotoxicity than synthetic molecules.

== Targeted drug delivery ==
Nanocarriers are useful in the drug delivery process because they can deliver drugs to site-specific targets, allowing drugs to be delivered in certain organs or cells but not in others. Site-specificity is a major therapeutic benefit as it prevents drugs from being delivered to the wrong places. Nanocarriers show promise for use in chemotherapy because they can help decrease the adverse, broader-scale toxicity of chemotherapy on healthy, fast growing cells around the body. Since chemotherapy drugs can be extremely toxic to human cells, it is important that they are delivered to the tumor without being released into other parts of the body. Four methods in which nanocarriers can deliver drugs include passive targeting, active targeting, pH specificity, and temperature specificity.

=== Passive targeting ===
Enhanced permeability and retention (EPR) effect and passive targeting. Nanocarriers can extravasate into the tumors through the gaps between endothelial cells and accumulate there due to poor lymphatic drainage.

Passive targeting refers to a nanocarrier's ability to travel down a tumor's vascular system, become trapped, and accumulate in the tumor. This accumulation is caused by the enhanced permeability and retention effect which refers to the poly(ethylene oxide) (PEO) coating on the outside of many nanocarriers. PEO allows nanocarriers to travel through the leaky vasculature of a tumor, where they are unable to escape. The leaky vasculature of a tumor is the network of blood vessels that form in a tumor, which contain many small pores. These pores allow nanocarriers in, but also contain many bends that allow the nanocarriers to become trapped. As more nanocarriers become trapped, the drug accumulates at the tumor site. This accumulation causes large doses of the drug to be delivered directly to the tumor site. PEO may also have some adverse effects on cell-nanocarrier interactions, weakening the effects of the drug, since many nanocarriers must be incorporated into the cells before the drugs can be released.

=== Active targeting ===
Active targeting involves the incorporation of targeting modules such as ligands or antibodies on the surface of nanocarriers that are specific to certain types of cells around the body. Nanocarriers have such a high surface-area to volume ratio allowing for multiple ligands to be incorporated on their surfaces. These targeting modules allow for the nanocarriers to be incorporated directly inside of cells, but also have some drawbacks. Ligands may cause nanocarriers to become slightly more toxic due to non-specific binding, and positive charges on ligands may decrease drug delivery efficiency once inside of cells. Active targeting has been shown to help overcome multi-drug resistance in tumor cells.

=== pH specificity ===
Certain nanocarriers will only release the drugs they contain in specific pH ranges. pH specificity also allows nanocarriers to deliver drugs directly to a tumor site. Tumors are generally more acidic than normal human cells, with a pH around 6.8. Normal tissue has a pH of around 7.4. Nanocarriers that only release drugs at certain pH ranges can therefore be used to release the drug only within acidic tumor environments. High acidic environments cause the drug to be released due to the acidic environment degrading the structure of the nanocarrier. These nanocarriers will not release drugs in neutral or basic environments, effectively targeting the acidic environments of tumors while leaving normal body cells untouched. This pH sensitivity can also be induced in micelle systems by adding copolymer chains to micelles that have been determined to act in a pH independent manor. These micelle-polymer complexes also help to prevent cancer cells from developing multi-drug resistance. The low pH environment triggers a quick release of the micelle polymers, causing a majority of the drug to be released at once, rather than gradually like other drug treatments. This quick release mechanism significantly decreases the time it takes for anticancer drugs to kill a tumor, effectively preventing the tumor from having time to undergo mutations that would render it drug resistant.

=== Temperature specificity ===
Some nanocarriers have also been shown to deliver drugs more effectively at certain temperatures. Since tumor temperatures are generally higher than temperatures throughout the rest of the body, around 40 °C, this temperature gradient helps act as safeguard for tumor-specific site delivery.

== Uses ==
Most of research on nanocarriers is being applied to their potential use in drug delivery, especially in chemotherapy. Since nanocarriers can be used to specifically target the small pores, lower pH's, and higher temperatures of tumors, they have the potential to lower the toxicity of many chemotherapy drugs. Also, since almost 75% of anticancer drugs are hydrophobic, and therefore demonstrate difficulty in delivery inside human cells, the use of micelles to stabilize, and effectively mask the hydrophobic nature of hydrophobic drugs provides new possibilities for hydrophobic anticancer drugs.
