= Overhauser effect =

Overhauser effect:

- Overhauser effect, a case of dynamic nuclear polarization
- Nuclear Overhauser effect
