= Solomon equations =

Dipolar relaxation process of a system

In NMR spectroscopy, the Solomon equations describe the dipolar relaxation process of a system consisting of two spins. They take the form of the following differential equations:

${d{I_{1z}} \over dt}=-R_z^1(I_{1z}-I_{1z}^0)-\sigma_{12}(I_{2z}-I_{2z}^0)$

${d{I_{2z}} \over dt}=-R_z^2(I_{2z}-I_{2z}^0)-\sigma_{12}(I_{1z}-I_{1z}^0)$

${d{I_{1z}I_{2z}} \over dt}=-R_z^{12}2I_{1z}I_{2z}$

These equations, so named after physicist Ionel Solomon, describe how the population of the different spin states changes in relation to the strength of the self-relaxation rate constant R and $\sigma_{12}$, which accounts instead for cross-relaxation. The latter is the important term which is responsible for transferring magnetization from one spin to the other and gives rise to the nuclear Overhauser effect.

In an NOE experiment, the magnetization on one of the spins, say spin 2, is reversed by applying a selective pulse sequence. At short times then, the resulting magnetization on spin 1 will be given by

${d{I_{1z}} \over dt}=-R_z^1(I_{1z}^0-I_{1z}^0)-\sigma_{12}(-I_{2z}^0-I_{2z}^0)=2\sigma_{12}I_{2z}^0$

since there is no time for a significant change in the populations of the energy levels. Integrating with respect to time gives:

$I_{1z}(t)=2\sigma_{12}tI_{2z}^0+I_{1z}^0$

which results in an enhancement of the signal of spin 1 on the spectrum. Typically, another spectrum is recorded without applying the reversal of magnetization on spin 2 and the signals from the two experiments are then subtracted. In the final spectrum, only peaks which have an nOe enhancement show up, demonstrating which spins are in spatial proximity in the molecule under study: only those will in fact have a significant $\sigma_{12}$ cross relaxation factor.
