= Relaxometry =

Relaxometry refers to the study and/or measurement of relaxation variables in Nuclear Magnetic Resonance and Magnetic Resonance Imaging. Often referred to as Time-Domain NMR. In NMR, nuclear magnetic moments are used to measure specific physical and chemical properties of materials.

Relaxation of the nuclear spin system is crucial for all NMR applications. The relaxation rate depends strongly on the mobility (fluctuations, diffusion) of the microscopic environment and the strength of the applied magnetic field. As a rule of thumb, strong magnetic fields lead to increased sensitivity on fast dynamics while low fields lead to increased sensitivity on slow dynamics. Thus, the relaxation rate as a function of the magnetic field strength is a fingerprint of the microscopic dynamics. Key Materials science properties are often described in different fields using the terms mobility / dynamics / stiffness / viscosity / rigidity of the sample. These properties are usually dependent on atomic and molecular motion in the sample, which may be measured using time-domain NMR and fast field cycling relaxometry.

== Equipment ==
Apparatus and technological support of the method is constantly developed. An NMR relaxometer is a device for relaxation time measuring. Laboratory NMR relaxometers for NMR signal registration are available in small sizes. In NMR relaxometry (NMRR) only one specific NMRR parameter is measured, not the whole spectrum (which is not always needed). This helps to save time and resources and makes it possible to use an NMR relaxometer as a portable express analyzer in different branches of industry, science and technology, environmental protection, etc.
