= Albert Overhauser =

American physicist

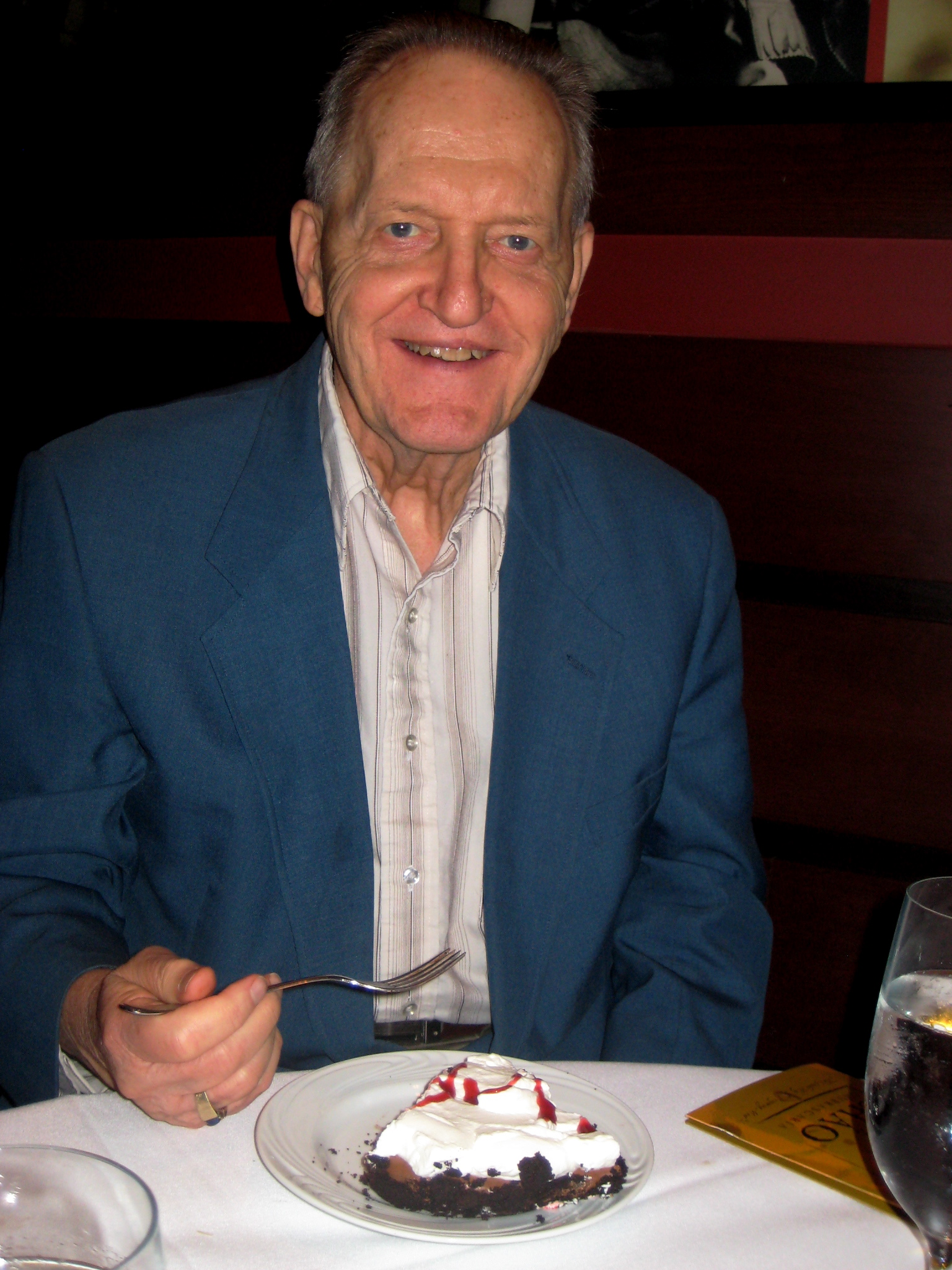
- Born: August 17, 1925; San Diego, California, United States
- Died: December 10, 2011 (aged 86); West Lafayette, Indiana, United States
- Education: University of California, Berkeley (BA, PhD)
- Known for: Overhauser effect
- Awards: Oliver E. Buckley Prize (1975); National Medal of Science (1994)
- Scientific career
- Fields: Condensed matter physics
- Workplaces: Cornell University, Purdue University
- Thesis: Studies in the electron theory of metals (1952)
- Doctoral advisor: Charles Kittel
- Doctoral students: John Hopfield

Albert W. Overhauser (August 17, 1925 – December 10, 2011) was an American physicist and a member of the National Academy of Sciences. He is best known for his theory of the Overhauser effect in nuclear magnetic resonance. The Overhauser effect was the first example of dynamic nuclear polarization whereby spin polarization is transferred from unpaired electrons in paramagnetic metals to nuclei resulting in a dramatic increase in their NMR intensity. The nuclear Overhauser effect, which follows the same mechanism, is also widely used in nuclear magnetic resonance and formed the basis for early protein structure determinations, for which Kurt Wüthrich was ultimately awarded the Nobel Prize in Chemistry in 2002.

== Life ==
Born in San Diego, California, Overhauser attended high school in San Francisco at Lick-Wilmerding High School and began his undergraduate work at the University of California, Berkeley in 1942. He interrupted his studies during World War II for a two-year stint in the U.S. Navy Reserve, then returned to Berkeley to complete his education.

Overhauser received a Bachelor of Arts with major in physics and mathematics in 1948 and a Doctor of Philosophy in 1952 in physics, both from the University of California, Berkeley. His doctoral advisor was Charles Kittel.

From 1951 to 1953, he was a post-doctoral researcher at the University of Illinois, where he developed his highly cited theory on the transfer of spin polarization; once the theory had been confirmed and demonstrated by other scientists, it became known as the Overhauser effect. He was on the faculty at Cornell University from 1953 to 1958, and then left to join the research staff at Ford Motor Company. Overhauser remained at Ford until 1973, when he joined the faculty at Purdue University. He remained at Purdue as the Stuart Distinguished Professor of Physics for the rest of his career. Overhauser died in 2011 in West Lafayette, Indiana.

== Honors and awards ==
- Received National Medal of Science, 1994
- Elected to the National Academy of Sciences, 1976
- Oliver E. Buckley Solid State Physics Prize, 1975
- Fellow of the American Academy of Arts and Sciences
- Honorary Doctor of Laws degree from Simon Fraser University, 1998
- Honorary Doctor of Science degree from the University of Chicago, 1979
- Honorary Doctor of Science Degree from Purdue University, 2005
