= Relaxation (NMR) =

Decay of nuclear spin polarization in MRI and NMR

In magnetic resonance imaging (MRI) and nuclear magnetic resonance spectroscopy (NMR), an observable nuclear spin polarization (magnetization) is created by a homogeneous magnetic field. This field makes the magnetic dipole moments of the sample precess at the resonance (Larmor) frequency of the nuclei. At thermal equilibrium, nuclear spins precess randomly about the direction of the applied field. They become abruptly phase coherent when they are hit by radiofrequency (RF) pulses at the resonant frequency, created orthogonal to the field. The RF pulses cause the population of spin-states to be perturbed from their thermal equilibrium value. The generated transverse magnetization can then induce a signal in an RF coil that can be detected and amplified by an RF receiver. The return of the longitudinal component of the magnetization to its equilibrium value is termed spin-lattice relaxation while the loss of phase-coherence of the spins is termed spin-spin relaxation, which is manifest as an observed free induction decay (FID).

For spin-1/2 nuclei (such as ^{1}H), the polarization due to spins oriented with the field N_{−} relative to the spins oriented against the field N_{+} is given by the Boltzmann distribution:

$$\frac{N_{+}}{N_{-}} = e^{-\frac{\Delta E}{kT}}$$

where ΔE is the energy level difference between the two populations of spins, k is the Boltzmann constant, and T is the sample temperature. At room temperature, the number of spins in the lower energy level, N_{−}, slightly outnumbers the number in the upper level, N_{+}. The energy gap between the spin-up and spin-down states in NMR is minute by atomic emission standards at magnetic fields conventionally used in MRI and NMR spectroscopy. Energy emission in NMR must be induced through a direct interaction of a nucleus with its external environment rather than by spontaneous emission. This interaction may be through the electrical or magnetic fields generated by other nuclei, electrons, or molecules. Spontaneous emission of energy is a radiative process involving the release of a photon and typified by phenomena such as fluorescence and phosphorescence. As stated by Abragam, the probability per unit time of the nuclear spin-1/2 transition from the + into the - state through spontaneous emission of a photon is a negligible phenomenon. Rather, the return to equilibrium is a much slower thermal process induced by the fluctuating local magnetic fields due to molecular or electron (free radical) rotational motions that return the excess energy in the form of heat to the surroundings.

== T_{1} and T_{2} ==
The decay of RF-induced NMR spin polarization is characterized in terms of two separate processes, each with their own time constants. One process, called T_{1}, is responsible for the loss of resonance intensity following pulse excitation. The other process, called T_{2}, characterizes the width or broadness of resonances. Stated more formally, T_{1} is the time constant for the physical processes responsible for the relaxation of the components of the nuclear spin magnetization vector M parallel to the external magnetic field, B_{0} (which is conventionally designated as the z-axis). T_{2} relaxation affects the coherent components of M perpendicular to B_{0}. In conventional NMR spectroscopy, T_{1} limits the pulse repetition rate and affects the overall time an NMR spectrum can be acquired. Values of T_{1} range from milliseconds to several seconds, depending on the size of the molecule, the viscosity of the solution, the temperature of the sample, and the possible presence of paramagnetic species (e.g., O_{2} or metal ions).

=== T_{1} ===
The longitudinal (or spin-lattice) relaxation time T_{1} is the decay constant for the recovery of the z component of the nuclear spin magnetization, M_{z}, towards its thermal equilibrium value, $M_{z,\mathrm{eq}}$. In general,

$$M_z(t) = M_{z,\mathrm{eq}} - [M_{z,\mathrm{eq}} - M_z(0)]e^{-t/T_1}$$

In specific cases:

- If M has been tilted into the xy plane, then $M_z(0)=0$ and the recovery is simply

$$M_z(t) = M_{z,\mathrm{eq}}\left( 1 - e^{-t/T_1} \right)$$

i.e. the magnetization recovers to 63% of its equilibrium value after one time constant T_{1}.

- In the inversion recovery experiment, commonly used to measure T_{1} values, the initial magnetization is inverted, $M_z(0)=-M_{z,\mathrm{eq}}$, and so the recovery follows

$$M_z(t) = M_{z,\mathrm{eq}}\left( 1 - 2e^{-t/T_1} \right)$$

T_{1} relaxation involves redistributing the populations of the nuclear spin states in order to reach the thermal equilibrium distribution. By definition, this is not energy conserving. Moreover, spontaneous emission is negligibly slow at NMR frequencies. Hence truly isolated nuclear spins would show negligible rates of T_{1} relaxation. However, a variety of relaxation mechanisms allow nuclear spins to exchange energy with their surroundings, the lattice, allowing the spin populations to equilibrate. The fact that T_{1} relaxation involves an interaction with the surroundings is the origin of the alternative description, spin-lattice relaxation.

Note that the rates of T_{1} relaxation (i.e., 1/T_{1}) are generally strongly dependent on the NMR frequency and so vary considerably with magnetic field strength B. Small amounts of paramagnetic substances in a sample speed up relaxation very much. By degassing, and thereby removing dissolved oxygen, the T_{1}/T_{2} of liquid samples easily go up to an order of ten seconds.

==== Spin saturation transfer ====
Especially for molecules exhibiting slowly relaxing (T_{1}) signals, the technique spin saturation transfer (SST) provides information on chemical exchange reactions. The method is widely applicable to fluxional molecules. This magnetization transfer technique provides rates, provided that they exceed 1/T_{1}.

=== T_{2} ===
Visual representation of the spin of a proton under a constant magnetic field B_{0}. Visualization of the $T_1$ and $T_2$ relaxation times.

The transverse (or spin-spin) relaxation time T_{2} is the decay constant for the component of M perpendicular to B_{0}, designated M_{xy}, M_{T}, or $M_{\perp}$. For instance, initial xy magnetization at time zero will decay to zero (i.e. equilibrium) as follows:

$$M_{xy}(t) = M_{xy}(0) e^{-t/T_2} \,$$

i.e. the transverse magnetization vector drops to 37% of its original magnitude after one time constant T_{2}.

T_{2} relaxation is a complex phenomenon, but at its most fundamental level, it corresponds to a decoherence of the transverse nuclear spin magnetization. Random fluctuations of the local magnetic field lead to random variations in the instantaneous NMR precession frequency of different spins. As a result, the initial phase coherence of the nuclear spins is lost, until eventually the phases are disordered and there is no net xy magnetization. Because T_{2} relaxation involves only the phases of other nuclear spins it is often called "spin-spin" relaxation.

Spin echo pulse sequence and magnetization decay animation.

T_{2} values are generally much less dependent on field strength, B, than T_{1} values.

Hahn echo decay experiment can be used to measure the T_{2} time, as shown in the animation below. The size of the echo is recorded for different spacings of the two applied pulses. This reveals the decoherence which is not refocused by the 180° pulse. In simple cases, an exponential decay is measured which is described by the $T_2$ time.

=== T_{2}* and magnetic field inhomogeneity ===
In an idealized system, all nuclei in a given chemical environment, in a magnetic field, precess with the same frequency. However, in real systems, there are minor differences in chemical environment which can lead to a distribution of resonance frequencies around the ideal. Over time, this distribution can lead to a dispersion of the tight distribution of magnetic spin vectors, and loss of signal (free induction decay). In fact, for most magnetic resonance experiments, this "relaxation" dominates. This results in dephasing.

However, decoherence because of magnetic field inhomogeneity is not a true "relaxation" process; it is not random, but dependent on the location of the molecule in the magnet. For molecules that aren't moving, the deviation from ideal relaxation is consistent over time, and the signal can be recovered by performing a spin echo experiment.

The corresponding transverse relaxation time constant is thus T_{2}^{*}, which is usually much smaller than T_{2}. The relation between them is:

$$\frac{1}{T_2^*}=\frac{1}{T_2}+\frac{1}{T_{inhom}} = \frac{1}{T_2}+\gamma \Delta B_0$$

where γ represents gyromagnetic ratio, and ΔB_{0} the difference in strength of the locally varying field.

Unlike T_{2}, T_{2}* is influenced by magnetic field gradient irregularities. The T_{2}* relaxation time is always shorter than the T_{2} relaxation time and is typically milliseconds for water samples in imaging magnets.

=== Is T_{1} always longer than T_{2}? ===
In NMR systems, the following relation holds absolute true $T_2 \le 2 T_1$. In most situations (but not in principle) $T_1$ is greater than $T_2$. The cases in which $2 T_1 > T_2 > T_1$ are rare, but not impossible.

== Bloch equations ==
Bloch equations are used to calculate the nuclear magnetization M = (M_{x}, M_{y}, M_{z}) as a function of time when relaxation times T_{1} and T_{2} are present. Bloch equations are phenomenological equations that were introduced by Felix Bloch in 1946.

$$\frac {\partial M_x(t)} {\partial t} = \gamma ( \mathbf {M} (t) \times \mathbf {B} (t) ) _x - \frac {M_x(t)} {T_2}$$
$$\frac {\partial M_y(t)} {\partial t} = \gamma ( \mathbf {M} (t) \times \mathbf {B} (t) ) _y - \frac {M_y(t)} {T_2}$$
$$\frac {\partial M_z(t)} {\partial t} = \gamma ( \mathbf {M} (t) \times \mathbf {B} (t) ) _z - \frac {M_z(t) - M_0} {T_1}$$

Where $\times$ is the cross-product, γ is the gyromagnetic ratio and B(t) = (B_{x}(t), B_{y}(t), B_{0} + B_{z}(t)) is the magnetic flux density experienced by the nuclei. The z component of the magnetic flux density B is typically composed of two terms: one, B_{0}, is constant in time, the other one, B_{z}(t), is time dependent. It is present in magnetic resonance imaging and helps with the spatial decoding of the NMR signal.

The equation listed above in the section on T_{1} and T_{2} relaxation are those in the Bloch equations.

== Solomon equations ==
Solomon equations are used to calculate the transfer of magnetization as a result of relaxation in a dipolar system. They can be employed to explain the nuclear Overhauser effect, which is an important tool in determining molecular structure.

== Common relaxation time constants in human tissues ==
Following is a table of the approximate values of the two relaxation time constants for hydrogen nuclear spins in nonpathological human tissues.

At a main field of 1.5 T
Tissue type	Approximate T_{1} value in ms	Approximate T_{2} value in ms
Adipose tissues	240-250	60-80
Whole blood (deoxygenated)	1350	50
Whole blood (oxygenated)	1350	200
Cerebrospinal fluid (similar to pure water)	4200 - 4500	2100-2300
Gray matter of cerebrum	920	100
White matter of cerebrum	780	90
Liver	490	40
Kidneys	650	60-75
Muscles	860-900	50

Following is a table of the approximate values of the two relaxation time constants for chemicals that commonly show up in human brain magnetic resonance spectroscopy (MRS) studies, physiologically or pathologically.

At a main field of 1.5 T
Signals of chemical groups	Relative resonance frequency	Approximate T_{1} value (ms)	Approximate T_{2} value (ms)
Creatine (Cr) and Phosphocreatine (PCr)	3.0 ppm	gray matter: 1150–1340, white matter: 1050–1360	gray matter: 198–207, white matter: 194-218
N-Acetyl group (NA), mainly from N-acetylaspartate (NAA)	2.0 ppm	gray matter: 1170–1370, white matter: 1220-1410	gray matter: 388–426, white matter: 436-519
—CH_{3} group of Lactate	1.33 ppm (doublet: 1.27 & 1.39 ppm)	(To be listed)	1040

== Relaxation in the rotating frame, T_{1ρ} ==
The discussion above describes relaxation of nuclear magnetization in the presence of a constant magnetic field B_{0}. This is called relaxation in the laboratory frame. Another technique, called relaxation in the rotating frame, is the relaxation of nuclear magnetization in the presence of the field B_{0} together with a time-dependent magnetic field B_{1}. The field B_{1} rotates in the plane perpendicular to B_{0} at the Larmor frequency of the nuclei in the B_{0}. The magnitude of B_{1} is typically much smaller than the magnitude of B_{0}. Under these circumstances the relaxation of the magnetization is similar to laboratory frame relaxation in a field B_{1}. The decay constant for the recovery of the magnetization component along B_{1} is called the spin-lattice relaxation time in the rotating frame and is denoted T_{1ρ}. Relaxation in the rotating frame is useful because it provides information on slow motions of nuclei.

== Microscopic mechanisms ==
Relaxation of nuclear spins requires a microscopic mechanism for a nucleus to change orientation with respect to the applied magnetic field and/or interchange energy with the surroundings (called the lattice). The most common mechanism is the magnetic dipole-dipole interaction between the magnetic moment of a nucleus and the magnetic moment of another nucleus or other entity (electron, atom, ion, molecule). This interaction depends on the distance between the pair of dipoles (spins) but also on their orientation relative to the external magnetic field. Several other relaxation mechanisms also exist. The chemical shift anisotropy (CSA) relaxation mechanism arises whenever the electronic environment around the nucleus is non spherical, the magnitude of the electronic shielding of the nucleus will then be dependent on the molecular orientation relative to the (fixed) external magnetic field. The spin rotation (SR) relaxation mechanism arises from an interaction between the nuclear spin and a coupling to the overall molecular rotational angular momentum. Nuclei with spin I ≥ 1 will have not only a nuclear dipole but a quadrupole. The nuclear quadrupole has an interaction with the electric field gradient at the nucleus which is again orientation dependent as with the other mechanisms described above, leading to the so-called quadrupolar relaxation mechanism.

Molecular reorientation or tumbling can then modulate these orientation-dependent spin interaction energies. According to quantum mechanics, time-dependent interaction energies cause transitions between the nuclear spin states which result in nuclear spin relaxation. The application of time-dependent perturbation theory in quantum mechanics shows that the relaxation rates (and times) depend on spectral density functions that are the Fourier transforms of the autocorrelation function of the fluctuating magnetic dipole interactions. The form of the spectral density functions depend on the physical system, but a simple approximation called the BPP theory is widely used.

Another relaxation mechanism is the electrostatic interaction between a nucleus with an electric quadrupole moment and the electric field gradient that exists at the nuclear site due to surrounding charges. Thermal motion of a nucleus can result in fluctuating electrostatic interaction energies. These fluctuations produce transitions between the nuclear spin states in a similar manner to the magnetic dipole-dipole interaction.

== BPP theory ==
In 1948, Nicolaas Bloembergen, Edward Mills Purcell, and Robert Pound proposed the so-called Bloembergen–Purcell–Pound (BPP) theory to explain the relaxation constant of a pure substance in correspondence with its state, taking into account the effect of tumbling motion of molecules on the local magnetic field disturbance. The theory agrees well with experiments on pure substances, but not for complicated environments such as the human body.

This theory makes the assumption that the autocorrelation function of the microscopic fluctuations causing the relaxation is proportional to $e^{-t/\tau_c}$, where $\tau_c$ is called the correlation time. From this theory, one can get T_{1} > T_{2} for magnetic dipolar relaxation:

$$\frac{1}{T_1}=K\left[\frac{\tau_c}{1+\omega_0^2\tau_c^2}+\frac{4\tau_c}{1+4\omega_0^2\tau_c^2}\right]$$
$$\frac{1}{T_2}=\frac{K}{2}\left[3\tau_c+\frac{5\tau_c}{1+\omega_0^2\tau_c^2}+\frac{2\tau_c}{1+4\omega_0^2\tau_c^2}\right]$$,

where $\omega_0$ is the Larmor frequency in correspondence with the strength of the main magnetic field $B_0$. $\tau_c$ is the correlation time of the molecular tumbling motion. $K=\frac{3\mu_0^2}{160\pi^2}\frac{\hbar^2\gamma^4}{r^6}$ is defined for spin-1/2 nuclei and is a constant with $\mu_0$ being the magnetic permeability of free space of the $\hbar=\frac{h}{2\pi}$ the reduced Planck constant, γ the gyromagnetic ratio of such species of nuclei, and r the distance between the two nuclei carrying magnetic dipole moment.

Taking for example the H_{2}O molecules in liquid phase without the contamination of oxygen-17, the value of K is 1.02×10^{10} s^{−2} and the correlation time $\tau_c$ is on the order of picoseconds = $10^{-12}$ s, while hydrogen nuclei ^{1}H (protons) at 1.5 tesla precess at a Larmor frequency of approximately 64 MHz (Simplified. BPP theory uses angular frequency indeed). We can then estimate using τ_{c} = 5×10^{−12} s:

$\omega_0\tau_c = 3.2\times 10^{-5}$(dimensionless)
$T_1=\left(1.02\times 10^{10}\left[\frac{ 5\times 10^{-12} }{1 + (3.2\times 10^{-5} )^2} + \frac{ 4\cdot 5\times 10^{-12} }{1 + 4\cdot (3.2\times 10^{-5} )^2}\right]\right)^{-1}$= 3.92 s
$T_2=\left(\frac{1.02\times 10^{10}}{2}\left[3\cdot 5\times 10^{-12} + \frac{5\cdot 5\times 10^{-12} }{1 + \left(3.2\times 10^{-5} \right)^2} + \frac{ 2\cdot 5\times 10^{-12} }{1 + 4\cdot (3.2\times 10^{-5} )^2}\right]\right)^{-1}$= 3.92 s,

which is close to the experimental value, 3.6 s. Meanwhile, we can see that at this extreme case, T_{1} equals T_{2}. As follows from the BPP theory, measuring the T_{1} times leads to internuclear distances r. One of the examples is accurate determinations of the metal – hydride (M-H) bond lengths in solutions by measurements of ^{1}H selective and non-selective T_{1} times in variable-temperature relaxation experiments via the equation:

$$r(M-H) = C \left(\frac{(1.4k + 4.47) T_{1min} }{ \nu}\right)^{1/6}$$

$k = (f-1)/(0.5-f/3)$, with $f = T_{1s} / T_1$

$$C = 10^7 \left(\frac{{\gamma}_H^2 {\gamma}_M^2 \hbar ^2 I_M(I_M +1)}{15}\right)^{1/6}$$

where r, frequency and T_{1} are measured in Å, MHz and s, respectively, and I_{M} is the spin of M.

== See also ==
- Nuclear magnetic resonance
- Nuclear magnetic resonance spectroscopy
- Nuclear magnetic resonance spectroscopy of carbohydrates
- Nuclear magnetic resonance spectroscopy of nucleic acids
- Nuclear magnetic resonance spectroscopy of proteins
- Protein dynamics
- Relaxation (physics)
- Relaxometry
- Spin–lattice relaxation
- Spin–spin relaxation
