= Anil Kumar (physicist) =

Indian experimental physicist (1941–2024)

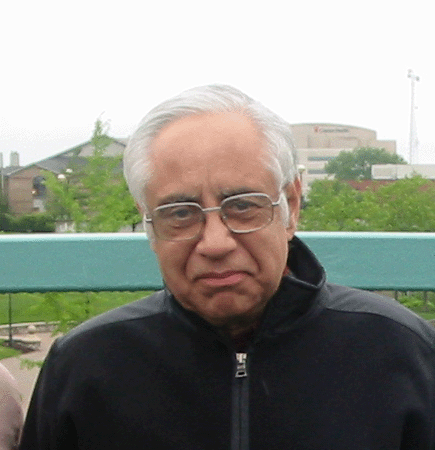
- Born: 25 June 1941
- Died: 9 November 2024 (aged 83); Bengaluru, India
- Known for: Studies on nuclear magnetic resonance spectroscopy, quantum information processing
- Spouse: Padma Kumar
- Children: Pankaja and Ankur

Anil Kumar (25 June 1941 — 9 November 2024) was an Indian experimental physicist known for his work in the field of nuclear magnetic resonance spectroscopy. He was a professor at the Indian Institute of Science in Bengaluru. Kumar died in Bengaluru on 9 November 2024, at the age of 83.

== Early life and education ==
Anil did his college studies at Meerut College (Agra University) from where he graduated in 1959 and completed his master's degree in 1961. From 1961 to 1964 he worked at Meerut College as a lecturer in physics, and then studied at Indian Institute of Technology Kanpur, graduating with a PhD degree in 1969 under the supervision of Prof. B. D. N. Rao.

Anil moved to the United States for his post-doctoral studies: one year at Georgia Institute of Technology, Atlanta and two years at the University of North Carolina.

== Career ==
Anil worked with Nobel laureate Richard R. Ernst as a research associate during 1973–76. He then worked jointly with Richard Ernst and Nobel laureate Kurt Wüthrich during 1979–80 at ETH Zurich, Switzerland, where he participated in the pioneering work on 2D NMR spectroscopy.

Anil joined the Department of Physics in January 1977 at Indian Institute of Science, Bangalore. He then was a Senior Scientific Officer (1977–82), Assistant Professor (1982–84), Associate Professor (1984–1990) and Professor (1990–2003) at IISc Bangalore.

He also held the position of chairman of the Department of Physics (1994–97). At IISc, he was associated with the NMR facility as Resident-in-charge (1977–82), as Joint Convener (1984–94) and as Convener (1998–2003). He worked on the development of modern NMR methodology, established a research group at the Indian Institute of Science Bangalore in this field, and trained a number of PhD students. He has published more than 150 research papers.

Anil initially worked on the development of double-resonance NMR techniques for relaxation studies. He performed the first 2D NMR experiment in liquids and the first 2D Fourier imaging experiment (which is now widely used in Magnetic resonance imaging). He also applied two-dimensional NMR techniques to the study of biomolecules. He was the first to apply the two-dimensional Nuclear Overhauser Effect (2D-NOE now known as NOESY) experiment to a biomolecule, which opened the field for the determination of three-dimensional structures of biomolecules in solution by NMR spectroscopy.

Anil also has major contributions in the field of NMR Quantum Information Processing and NMR quantum computing. He with his group has successfully demonstrated experimentally, distillation of pseudo pure states, implementation of logical operations and gates on 2,3 and 4 qubit systems as well as implemented 2 and 3 qubit Deutsch-Jozsa quantum algorithm, using one and two-dimensional NMR spectroscopy.

== Recognition ==
Anil was a fellow of Indian National Science Academy (INSA) and of the World Academy of Sciences Trieste. He was also a recipient of the Sir C.V.Raman Medal (Hari Om Trust of UGC) 1993, Platinum Jubilee Lecture Award of the Indian Science Congress Association 1994, Prof. K. Rangadhama Rao Memorial Award of INSA 1996, FICCI Award for Physical Sciences 1996–97, MSIL Chair at IISc 1994–97 and Alumni Award of IISc for Excellence in Research in Science 2000.

Anil received the 2001 Goyal Award in Chemistry, "Life-time Achievement Award" by the Indian Chemical Society for the year 2011 and the DAE-Raja Ramanna Prize Lecture in Physics of Jawaharlal Nehru Centre for Advanced Scientific Research (JNCASR) 2003. He held a Visiting Chair Condorcet at École normale supérieure (Paris) France in 1998 and Visiting Professorships at the University of North Carolina at Chapel Hill United States 1989–90, Indiana University – Purdue University Indianapolis USA 1994 and University of Michigan Ann Arbor 1998–99.

After superannuation, he was designated an Honorary Professor at IISc Bangalore and was a NASI Honorary Scientist at IISc Bengaluru.
