= Carbohydrate NMR spectroscopy =

Carbohydrate NMR spectroscopy is the application of nuclear magnetic resonance (NMR) spectroscopy to structural and conformational analysis of carbohydrates. This method allows the scientists to elucidate structure of monosaccharides, oligosaccharides, polysaccharides, glycoconjugates and other carbohydrate derivatives from synthetic and natural sources. Among structural properties that could be determined by NMR are primary structure (including stereochemistry), saccharide conformation, stoichiometry of substituents, and ratio of individual saccharides in a mixture. Modern high field NMR instruments used for carbohydrate samples, typically 500 MHz or higher, are able to run a suite of 1D, 2D, and 3D experiments to determine a structure of carbohydrate compounds.

== Carbohydrate NMR observables ==
=== Chemical shift ===
Common chemical shift ranges for nuclei within carbohydrate residues are:

- Typical ^{1}H NMR chemical shifts of carbohydrate ring protons are 3–6 ppm (4.5–5.5 ppm for anomeric protons).
- Typical ^{13}C NMR chemical shifts of carbohydrate ring carbons are 60–110 ppm

In the case of simple mono- and oligosaccharide molecules, all proton signals are typically separated from one another (usually at 500 MHz or better NMR instruments) and can be assigned using 1D NMR spectrum only. However, bigger molecules exhibit significant proton signal overlap, especially in the non-anomeric region (3-4 ppm). Carbon-13 NMR overcomes this disadvantage by larger range of chemical shifts and special techniques allowing to block carbon-proton spin coupling, thus making all carbon signals high and narrow singlets distinguishable from each other.

The typical ranges of specific carbohydrate carbon chemical shifts in the unsubstituted monosaccharides are:

- Anomeric carbons: 90-100 ppm
- Sugar ring carbons bearing a hydroxy function: 68-77
- Open-form sugar carbons bearing a hydroxy function: 71-75
- Sugar ring carbons bearing an amino function: 50-56
- Exocyclic hydroxymethyl groups: 60-64
- Exocyclic carboxy groups: 172-176
- Desoxygenated sugar ring carbons: 31-40
- A carbon at pyranose ring closure: 71-73 (α-anomers), 74-76 (β-anomers)
- A carbon at furanose ring closure: 80-83 (α-anomers), 83-86 (β-anomers)

=== Coupling constants ===
Direct carbon-proton coupling constants are used to study the anomeric configuration of a sugar. Vicinal proton-proton coupling constants are used to study stereo orientation of protons relatively to the other protons within a sugar ring, thus identifying a monosaccharide. Vicinal heteronuclear H-C-O-C coupling constants are used to study torsional angles along glycosidic bond between sugars or along exocyclic fragments, thus revealing a molecular conformation.

Sugar rings are relatively rigid molecular fragments, thus vicinal proton-proton couplings are characteristic:

- Equatorial to axial: 1–4 Hz
- Equatorial to equatorial: 0–2 Hz
- Axial to axial non-anomeric: 9–11 Hz
- Axial to axial anomeric: 7–9 Hz
- Axial to exocyclic hydroxymethyl: 5 Hz, 2 Hz
- Geminal between hydroxymethyl protons: 12 Hz

=== Nuclear Overhauser effects (NOEs) ===
NOEs are sensitive to interatomic distances, allowing their usage as a conformational probe, or proof of a glycoside bond formation. It's a common practice to compare calculated to experimental proton-proton NOEs in oligosaccharides to confirm a theoretical conformational map. Calculation of NOEs implies an optimization of molecular geometry.

=== Other NMR observables ===
Relaxivities, nuclear relaxation rates, line shape and other parameters were reported useful in structural studies of carbohydrates.

== Elucidation of carbohydrate structure by NMR spectroscopy ==
=== Structural parameters of carbohydrates ===
The following is a list of structural features that can be elucidated by NMR:

- Chemical structure of each carbohydrate residue in a molecule, including
  - carbon skeleton size and sugar type (aldose/ketose)
  - cycle size (pyranose/furanose/linear)
  - stereo configuration of all carbons (monosaccharide identification)
  - stereo configuration of anomeric carbon (α/β)
  - absolute configuration (D/L)
  - location of amino-, carboxy-, deoxy- and other functions
- Chemical structure of non-carbohydrate residues in molecule (amino acids, fatty acids, alcohols, organic aglycons etc.)
- Substitution positions in residues
- Sequence of residues
- Stoichiometry of terminal residues and side chains
- Location of phosphate and sulfate diester bonds
- Polymerization degree and frame positioning (for polysaccharides)

=== NMR spectroscopy vs. other methods ===
Widely known methods of structural investigation, such as mass-spectrometry and X-ray analysis are only limitedly applicable to carbohydrates. Such structural studies, such as sequence determination or identification of new monosaccharides, benefit the most from the NMR spectroscopy. Absolute configuration and polymerization degree are not always determinable using NMR only, so the process of structural elucidation may require additional methods. Although monomeric composition can be solved by NMR, chromatographic and mass-spectroscopic methods provide this information sometimes easier. The other structural features listed above can be determined solely by the NMR spectroscopic methods. The limitation of the NMR structural studies of carbohydrates is that structure elucidation can hardly be automatized and require a human expert to derive a structure from NMR spectra.

=== Application of various NMR techniques to carbohydrates ===
Complex glycans possess a multitude of overlapping signals, especially in a proton spectrum. Therefore, it is advantageous to utilize 2D experiments for the assignment of signals. The table and figures below list most widespread NMR techniques used in carbohydrate studies.

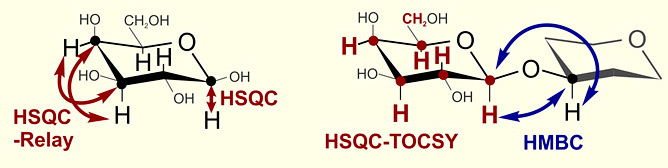
Heteronuclear NMR techniques in carbohydrate studies, and typical intra-residue (red) and inter-residue (blue) atoms that they link each to other.

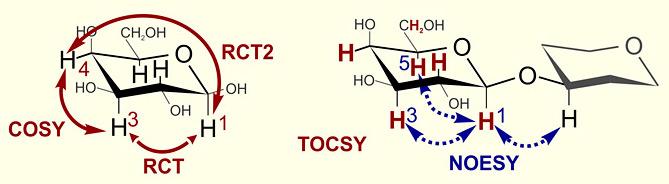
Homonuclear NMR techniques in carbohydrate studies, and typical intra-residue (red) and inter-residue (blue) atoms that they link each to other.

| NMR experiment | Description | Information obtained |
|---|---|---|
| ^{1}H 1D | 1D proton spectrum | measurement of couplings, general information, residue identification, basis for carbon spectrum assignment |
| ^{13}C BB | Proton-decoupled 1D carbon-13 spectrum | detailed information, residue identification, substitution positions |
| ^{31}P BB, ^{15}N BB | Proton-decoupled 1D heteronuclei spectra | additional information |
| APT, ^{13}C DEPT | attached proton test, driven enhanced polarization transfer (edited 1D carbon-13 spectrum) | assignment of CH_{2} groups |
| ^{13}C Gated, ^{31}P Gated | Proton-coupled 1D carbon-13 and heteronuclei spectra | measurement of heteronuclear couplings, elucidation of anomeric configuration, conformational studies |
| ^{1}H,^{1}H J-resolved | 2D NMR plot showing J-couplings in second dimension | accurate J-couplings and chemical shift values for crowded spectral regions |
| ^{1}H DOSY | 2D NMR plot with proton spectra as a function of molecular diffusion coefficient | measurement of diffusion coefficient, estimate of molecular size/weight, spectral separation of different molecules in a mixture |
| ^{1}H,^{1}H COSY | Proton spin correlation | proton spectrum assignment using vicinal couplings |
| COSY RCT, COSY RCT2 | Proton spin correlation with one- or two-step relayed coherence transfer | proton spectrum assignment where signals of neighboring vicinal protons overlap |
| DQF COSY | Double-quantum filtered proton spin correlation | J-coupling magnitudes & number of protons participating in the J-coupling |
| ^{1}H HD dif | Selective differential homodecoupling | line shape analysis of the overlapped proton signals |
| TOCSY (HOHAHA) | Total correlation of all protons within a spin system | distinguishing of spin systems of residues |
| 1D TOCSY | TOCSY of a single signal | extraction of a spin system of a certain residue |
| NOESY, ROESY | Homonuclear Nuclear Overhauser effect correlation (through space) | revealing of spatially proximal proton pairs, determination of a sequence of residues, determination of averaged conformation |
| ^{1}H NOE dif | Selective differential NOE measurement | studies of proton spatial contacts |
| ^{1}H,^{13}C HSQC | Heteronuclear single-quantum coherence, direct proton-carbon spin correlation | carbon spectrum assignment |
| ^{1}H,^{31}P HSQC | Heteronuclear single-quantum coherence, proton-phosphorus spin correlation | localization of phosphoric acid residues in phosphoglycans |
| ^{1}H,^{13}C HMBC | Heteronuclear multiple-bond correlation, vicinal proton-carbon spin correlation | determination of residue sequence, acetylation/amidation pattern, confirmation of substitution positions |
| ^{1}H,X 1D HMBC | HMBC for a single signal | assignment of proton around a certain carbon or heteroatom |
| ^{1}H,^{13}C HSQC Relay | Implicit carbon-carbon correlation via vicinal couplings of the attached protons | assignment of neighboring carbon atoms |
| ^{1}H,^{13}C HSQC-TOCSY | Correlation of protons with all carbons within a spin system, and vice versa | assignment of C5 using H6 and solving similar problems, separation of carbon spectrum into subspectra of residues |
| ^{1}H,X 1D NOE | Heteronuclear NOE measurement | heteronuclear spatial contacts, conformations |

=== Research scheme ===
NMR spectroscopic research includes the following steps:

- Extraction of carbohydrate material (for natural glycans)
- Chemical removal of moieties masking regularity (for polymers)
- Separation and purification of carbohydrate material (for 2D NMR experiments, 10 mg or more is recommended)
- Sample preparation (usually in D_{2}O)
- Acquisition of 1D spectra
- Planning, acquisition and processing of other NMR experiments (usually requires from 5 to 20 hours)
- Assignment and interpretation of spectra (see exemplary figure)
- If a structural problem could not be solved: chemical modification/degradation and NMR analysis of products
- Acquisition of spectra of the native (unmasked) compound and their interpretation based on modified structure
- Presentation of results

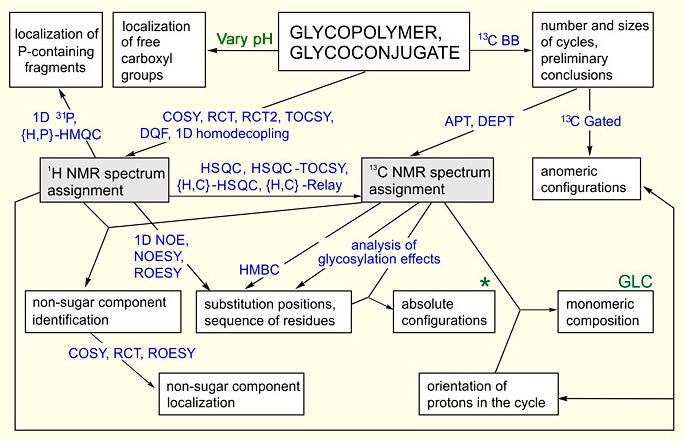
Approximate scheme of NMR (blue) and other (green) techniques applied to carbohydrate structure elucidation, and information obtained (in boxes)

== Carbohydrate NMR databases and tools ==
Multiple chemical shift databases and related services have been created to aid structural elucidation of and expert analysis of their NMR spectra. Of them, several informatics tools are dedicated solely to carbohydrates:

- GlycoSCIENCES.de
  - over 4,000 NMR spectra of mammalian glycans
  - search of structure by NMR signals and vice versa
- CSDB (carbohydrate structure database) contains:
  - over 20,000 NMR spectra (as of 2024) of bacterial, plant, fungal and protistal glycans,
  - search of structure by NMR signals and vice versa
  - empirical spectra simulation routine optimized for carbohydrates,
  - statistical chemical shift estimation based on HOSE algorithm optimized for carbohydrates,
  - structure generation and NMR-based ranking tool.
- CASPER (computer assisted spectrum evaluation of regular polysaccharides). contains:
  - chemical shift database,
  - empirical spectra simulation routine optimized for carbohydrates,
  - online interface.
  - structure matching tool. Both proton and carbon C and H chemical shifts can be used to access structural information.

=== Simulation of the NMR observables ===
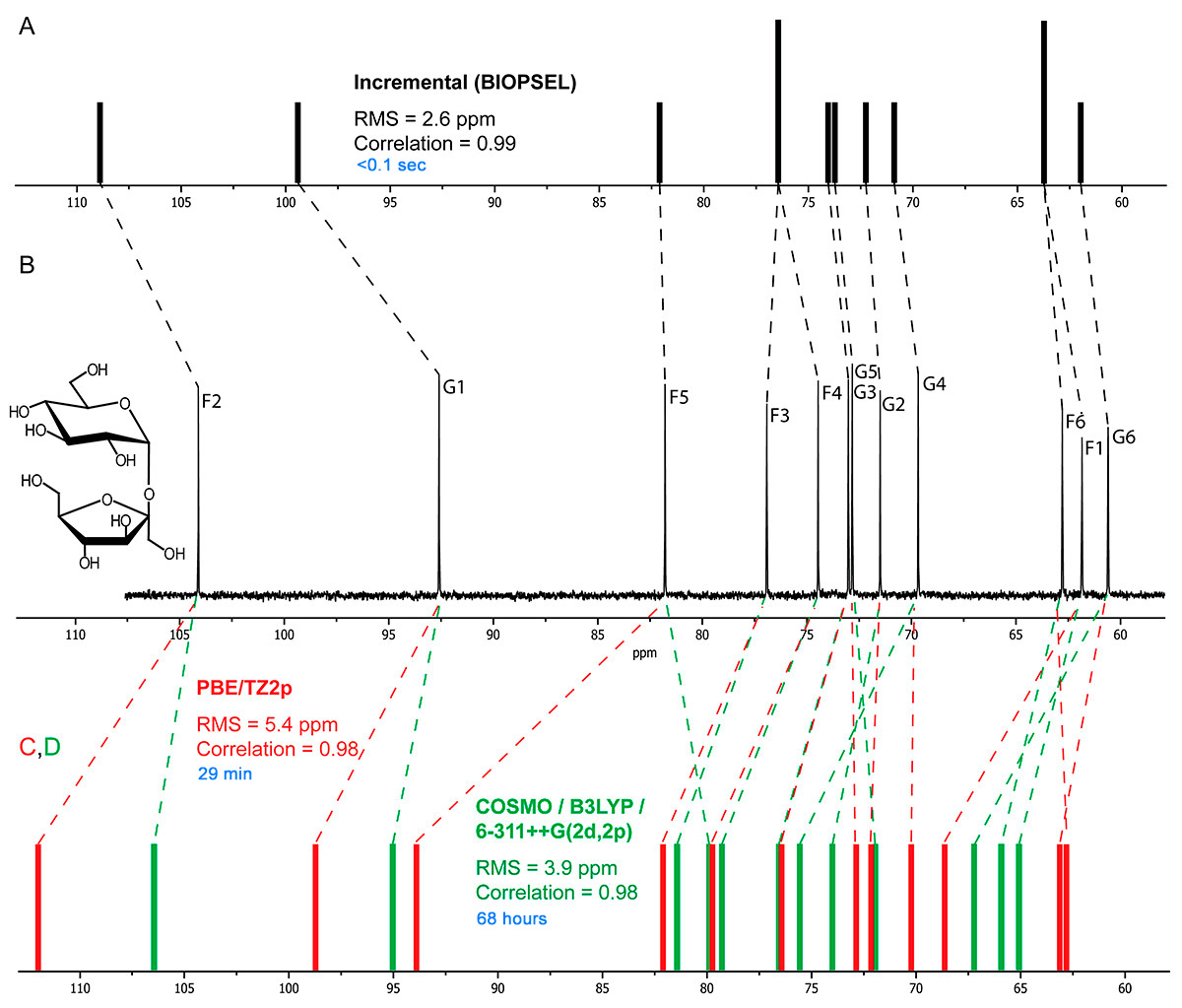
Comparative prediction of the 13C NMR spectrum of sucrose using various methods. Experimental spectrum is in the middle. Upper spectrum (black) was obtained by empirical routine. Lower spectra (red and green) were obtained by quantum-chemical calculations in PRIRODA and GAUSSIAN respectively. Included information: used theory level/basis set/solvent model, accuracy of prediction (linear correlation factor and root mean square deviation), calculation time on personal computer (blue).

Several approaches to simulate NMR observables of carbohydrates has been reviewed. They include:

- Universal statistical database approaches (ACDLabs, Modgraph, etc.)
- Usage of neural networks to refine the predictions
- Regression based methods
- CHARGE
- Carbohydrate-optimized empirical schemes (CSDB/BIOPSEL, CASPER).
- Combined molecular mechanics/dynamics geometry calculation and quantum-mechanical simulation/iteration of NMR observables (PERCH NMR Software)
- ONIOM approaches (optimization of different parts of molecule with different accuracy)
- Ab initio calculations.

Growing computational power allows usage of thorough quantum-mechanical calculations at high theory levels and large basis sets for refining the molecular geometry of carbohydrates and subsequent prediction of NMR observables using GIAO and other methods with or without solvent effect account. Among combinations of theory level and a basis set reported as sufficient for NMR predictions were B3LYP/6-311G++(2d,2p) and PBE/PBE (see review). It was shown for saccharides that carbohydrate-optimized empirical schemes provide significantly better accuracy (0.0-0.5 ppm per ^{13}C resonance) than quantum chemical methods (above 2.0 ppm per resonance) reported as best for NMR simulations, and work thousands times faster. However, these methods can predict only chemical shifts and perform poor for non-carbohydrate parts of molecules. As a representative example, see figure on the right.

== See also ==
- Methods of 1D and 2D NMR spectroscopy in structural studies of natural glycopolymers (lection)
- Carbohydrate databases in the recent decade (lection; includes NMR simulation data)
- Carbohydrate
- Glycan
- Nuclear magnetic resonance
- Nuclear magnetic resonance spectroscopy of nucleic acids
- Nuclear magnetic resonance spectroscopy of proteins
- NMR spectroscopy
- Nuclear Overhauser effect
