= CING (biomolecular NMR structure) =

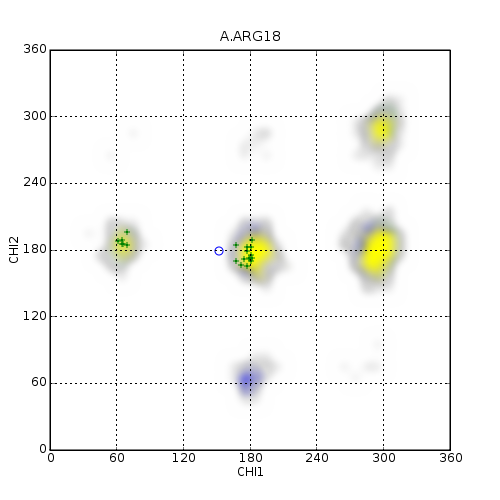
A Janin Plot generated by CING from chain A, Arginine residue number 18 in the protein Dynein Light Chain, (PDB ID 1y4o). The blue region show likely angle combinations for helical residues, while the yellow areas display regions that are common to strand-like stretches. Some green background can be seen for residues that are in other types of regions. The image was taken from the residue page here at the NRG-CING archive of validation reports

In biomolecular structure, CING stands for the Common Interface for NMR structure Generation and is known for structure and NMR data validation.

NMR spectroscopy provides diverse data on the solution structure of biomolecules. CING combines many external programs and internalized algorithms to direct an author of a new structure or a biochemist interested in an existing structure to regions of the molecule that might be problematic in relation to the experimental data.

The source code is maintained open to the public at Google Code. There is a secure web interface iCing available for new data.

== Applications ==
- 9000+ validation reports for existing Protein Data Bank structures in NRG-CING.
- CING has been applied to automatic predictions in the CASD-NMR experiment with results available at CASD-NMR.

== Validated NMR data ==
- Protein or Nucleic acid structure together called Biomolecular structure
- Chemical shift
- (Nuclear Overhauser effect) Distance restraint
- Dihedral angle restraint
- RDC or Residual dipolar coupling restraint
- NMR (cross-)peak

== Software ==
Following software is used internally or externally by CING:

- 3DNA
- Collaborative Computing Project for NMR
- CYANA (Software)
- DSSP (algorithm)
- MOLMOL
- Matplotlib
- Nmrpipe
- PROCHECK/Aqua
- POV-Ray
- ShiftX
- TALOS+
- WHAT_CHECK
- Wattos
- XPLOR-NIH
- Yasara

Algorithms

- Saltbridge
- Disulfide bridge
- Outlier

== Funding ==
The NRG-CING project was supported by the European Community grants 213010 (eNMR) and 261572 (WeNMR).
