= Axel T. Brunger =

German American biophysicist

- Born: November 25, 1956 (age 69); Leipzig, East Germany
- Education: University of Hamburg; Technical University of Munich
- Known for: Developing Crystallography and NMR system
- Scientific career
- Workplaces: Yale University; Stanford University

Axel T. Brunger (born November 25, 1956) is a German American biophysicist. He is Professor of Molecular and Cellular Physiology at Stanford University, and a Howard Hughes Medical Institute Investigator. He served as the Chair of the Department of Molecular and Cellular Physiology (2013–2017).

== Early life ==
Brunger was born in Leipzig, East Germany, on November 25, 1956. He graduated with a degree in Physics and Mathematics from the University of Hamburg in 1977. He completed his Diplom in Physics from the University of Hamburg in 1980. He completed his PhD in Biophysics from Technical University of Munich in 1982, advised by Klaus Schulten.

== Academic career ==
Brunger held a NATO postdoctoral fellowship to work with Martin Karplus at Harvard University, where he subsequently became a research associate in the department of chemistry after a brief return to Germany. He joined the molecular biophysics and biochemistry department at Yale University in 1987 and moved to Stanford University in 2000. Brunger was elected to the United States National Academy of Sciences in 2005 and won the inaugural DeLano Award for Computational Biosciences in 2011.

== Research ==
Brunger is known for developing a computer program called CNS used for solving structures based on X-ray diffraction or solution NMR data, which was first released in 1992. The program is a major extension of a 1987 program developed with John Kuriyan and Karplus called X-PLOR, whose original inspiration was motivated by Marius Clore's efforts in interpreting NMR data and which has been extended by Clore's continued development of XPLOR-NIH.

These programs make use of a method called simulated annealing in conjunction with molecular dynamics to refine protein structures. X-PLOR was the first time a modern optimization technique was applied to the problem of crystallographic refinement. Brunger also subsequently introduced the RFree technique to cross-validate the model given the observed data. In the mid-1990s, his team extended X-PLOR into a complete system to solve structures, which then became the more full-featured tool CNS, capable of performing a series of steps necessary for crystallography structure determination, such as obtaining phases from experimental data and molecular replacement phasing from known homologous structures.

Brunger's research group currently studies the molecular mechanism of synaptic vesicle fusion in neurotransmission.
