= WeNMR =

Worldwide e-Infrastructure for NMR spectroscopy and structural biology

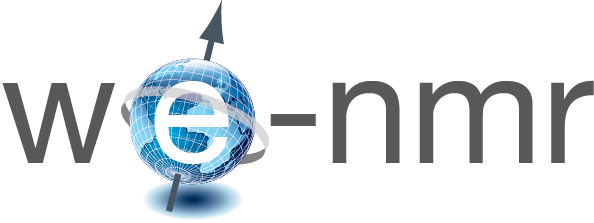

WeNMR is a worldwide e-Infrastructure for NMR spectroscopy and structural biology. It is the largest virtual Organization in the life sciences and is supported by EGI.

== Goals ==
WeNMR aims at bringing together complementary research teams in the structural biology and life science area into a virtual research community at a worldwide level and provide them with a platform integrating and streamlining the computational approaches necessary for NMR and SAXS data analysis and structural modelling. Access to the infrastructure is provided through a portal integrating commonly used software and GRID technology.

== Services ==
There are about 2 dozen computational NMR services available that can be divided into:

- Processing: MDD NMR
- Assignment: Auto Assign • MARS • UNIO
- Analysis: TALOS+ • AnisoFIT • MaxOcc • iCing
- Structure Calculation: CS-ROSETTA • CYANA • UNIO • Xplor-NIH
- Molecular Dynamics: AMBER • GROMACS
- Modelling: 3D-DART • HADDOCK
- Tools: Format Converter • SHIFTX2 • Antechamber • PREDITOR • RCI • UPLABEL

== Associated activities ==
- Critical Assessment of Automated Structure Determination of Proteins from NMR Data (CASD-NMR ) is hosted by WeNMR. The first CASD-NMR paper, describing the results achieved in the 2009-2010 round, has been published in Structure.
- The WeNMR facilitated the creation of an archive of 9000+ validation reports on Protein Data Bank structures in NRG-CING.
- WeNMR closely collaborates with the ESFRI project Instruct for Integrated structural biology

== History ==
The three-year WeNMR project started in November 2010 as the natural successor of the eNMR project. Financial support was provided by the European Community grants 213010 (eNMR) and 261572 (WeNMR) in the 7th Framework Programme (e-Infrastructure RI-261571).

== Partners ==
Participant organisation name	Country
Universiteit Utrecht (BCBR) (Coordinator)	Netherlands
Johann Wolfgang Goethe Universitaet Frankfurt am Main (BMRZ)	Germany
Consorzio Interuniversitario Risonanze Magnetiche di Metallo Proteine (CIRMMP)	Italy
Istituto Nazionale di Fisica Nucleare (INFN)	Italy
Radboud Universiteit Nijmegen (RUN)	Netherlands
University of Cambridge (UCAM )	UK
European Molecular Biology Organization (EMBL) - Hamburg Outstation	Germany
Spronk NMR Consultancy SpronkNMR	Lithuania
Academia Sinica, Taipei	Taiwan
