= Crystallography and NMR system =

CNS
- Developer(s): Axel T. Brunger, G. Marius Clore, and others
- Stable release: 1.3 / 22 July 2010; 15 years ago
- Written in: Fortran
- Operating system: Mac, Linux
- Type: X-Ray Crystallography, NMR Spectroscopy
- Licence: Free to Academic (Non-profit) Institutions
- Website: cns-online.org

CNS or Crystallography and NMR system, is a software library for computational structural biology. It is an offshoot of X-PLOR and uses much of the same syntax. It is used in the fields of X-ray crystallography and NMR spectroscopy of biological macromolecules.
