= Nitrogen-15 nuclear magnetic resonance spectroscopy =

Analytical technique

Nitrogen-15 nuclear magnetic resonance spectroscopy (nitrogen-15 NMR spectroscopy, or just simply ^{15}N NMR) is a version of nuclear magnetic resonance spectroscopy that examines samples containing the ^{15}N nucleus. ^{15}N NMR differs in several ways from the more common ^{13}C and ^{1}H NMR. To circumvent the difficulties associated with measurement of the quadrupolar, spin-1 ^{14}N nuclide, ^{15}N NMR is employed in samples for detection since it has a ground-state spin of ½. Since^{14}N is 99.64% abundant, incorporation of ^{15}N into samples often requires novel synthetic techniques.

Nitrogen-15 is frequently used in nuclear magnetic resonance spectroscopy (NMR), because unlike the more abundant nitrogen-14, that has an integer nuclear spin and thus a quadrupole moment, ^{15}N has a fractional nuclear spin of one-half, which offers advantages for NMR like narrower line width. Proteins can be isotopically labeled by cultivating them in a medium containing nitrogen-15 as the only source of nitrogen. In addition, nitrogen-15 is used to label proteins in quantitative proteomics (e.g. SILAC).

== Implementation ==
^{15}N NMR has complications not encountered in ^{1}H and ^{13}C NMR spectroscopy. The 0.36% natural abundance of ^{15}N results in a major sensitivity penalty. Sensitivity is made worse by its low gyromagnetic ratio (γ = −27.126 × 10^{6} T^{−1}s^{−1}), which is 10.14% that of ^{1}H. The signal-to-noise ratio for ^{1}H is about 300-fold greater than ^{15}N at the same magnetic field strength.

=== Physical properties ===
The physical properties of ^{15}N are quite different from other nuclei. Its properties along with several common nuclei are summarized in the below table.

Isotope	Magnetic dipole moment (μ_{N})	Nuclear spin number	Natural abundance (%)	Gyromagnetic ratio (10^{6} rad s^{−1} T^{−1})	NMR frequency at 11.7T (MHz)
^{1}H	2.79284734(3)	1/2	~100	267.522	-500
^{2}H	0.857438228(9)	1	0.015	41.066	-76.753
^{3}H	2.97896244(4)	1/2	0	285.349	-533.32
^{10}B	1.80064478(6)	3	19.9	28.747	-53.718
^{11}B	2.6886489	3/2	80.1	85.847	-160.42
^{13}C	0.7024118(14)	1/2	1.1	67.238	-125.725
^{14}N	0.40376100(6)	1	99.6	19.338	-36.132
^{15}N	-0.28318884(5)	1/2	0.37	-27.126	50.782
^{17}O	-1.89379(9)	5/2	0.04	-36.281	67.782
^{19}F	2.628868(8)	1/2	~100	251.815	-470.47
^{31}P	1.13160(3)	1/2	~100	108.394	-202.606

From these data, one can see that at full enrichment, ^{15}N is about one tenth (-27.126/267.522) as sensitive as ^{1}H.

=== Chemical shift trends ===
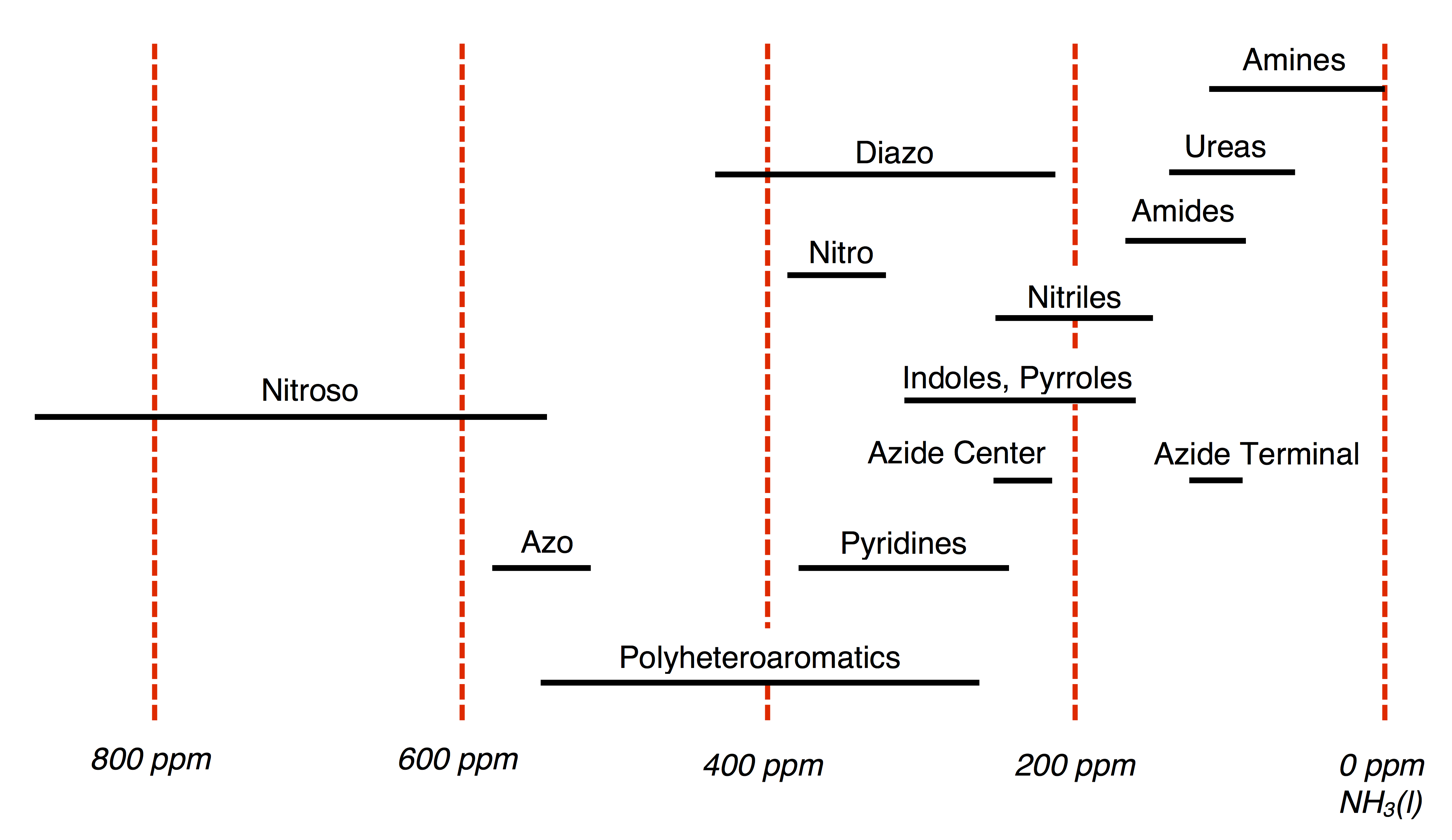
Typical ^{15}N chemical shift (δ) values for common organic groups where pressurized liquid ammonia is the standard and assigned a chemical shift of 0 ppm.

The International Union of Pure and Applied Chemistry (IUPAC) recommends using CH_{3}NO_{2} as the experimental standard; however in practice many spectroscopists utilize pressurized NH_{3}(l) instead. For ^{15}N, chemical shifts referenced with NH_{3}(l) are 380.5 ppm upfield from CH_{3}NO_{2} (δ_{NH_{3}} = δ_{CH_{3}NO_{2}} - 380.5 ppm). Chemical shifts for ^{15}N are somewhat erratic but typically they span a range of -400 ppm to 1100 ppm with respect to CH_{3}NO_{2}. Below is a summary of ^{15}N chemical shifts for common organic groups referenced with respect to NH_{3}, whose chemical shift is assigned 0 ppm.

=== Gyromagnetic ratio ===
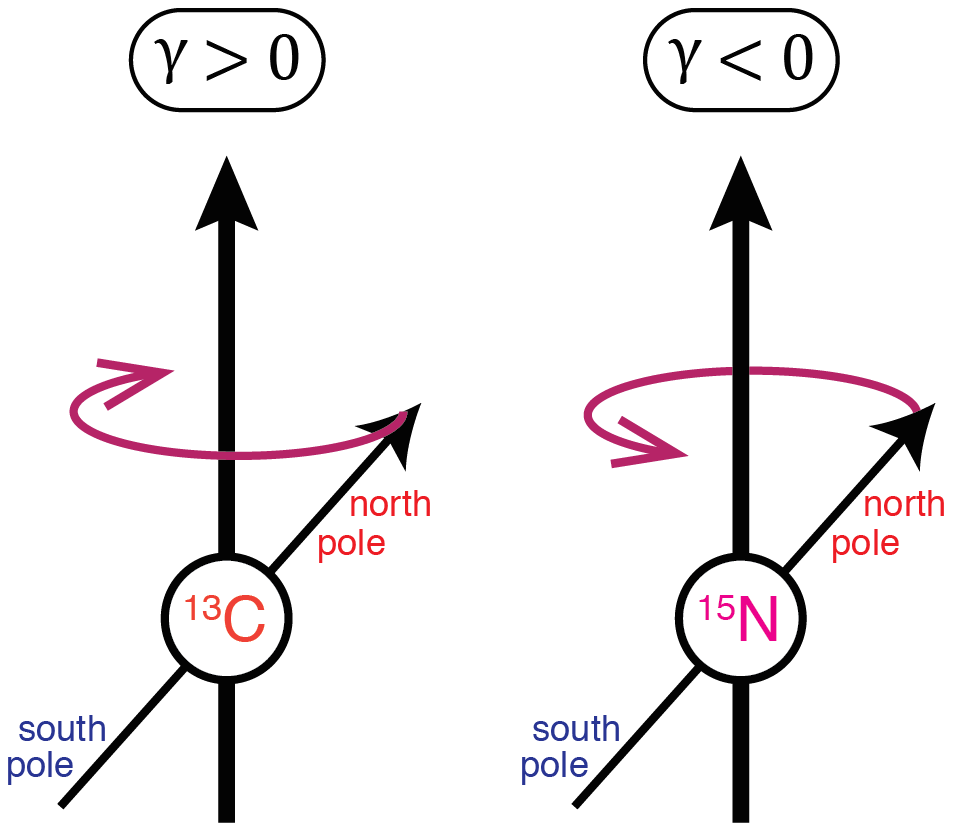
The sign of the gyromagnetic ratio, γ, determines the sense of precession. Nuclei such as ^{1}H and ^{13}C are said to have clockwise precession whereas ^{15}N has counterclockwise precession.

Unlike most nuclei, the gyromagnetic ratio for ^{15}N is negative. With the spin precession phenomenon, the sign of γ determines the sense (clockwise vs counterclockwise) of precession. Most common nuclei have positive gyromagnetic ratios such as ^{1}H and ^{13}C.

== Applications ==
=== Tautomerization ===
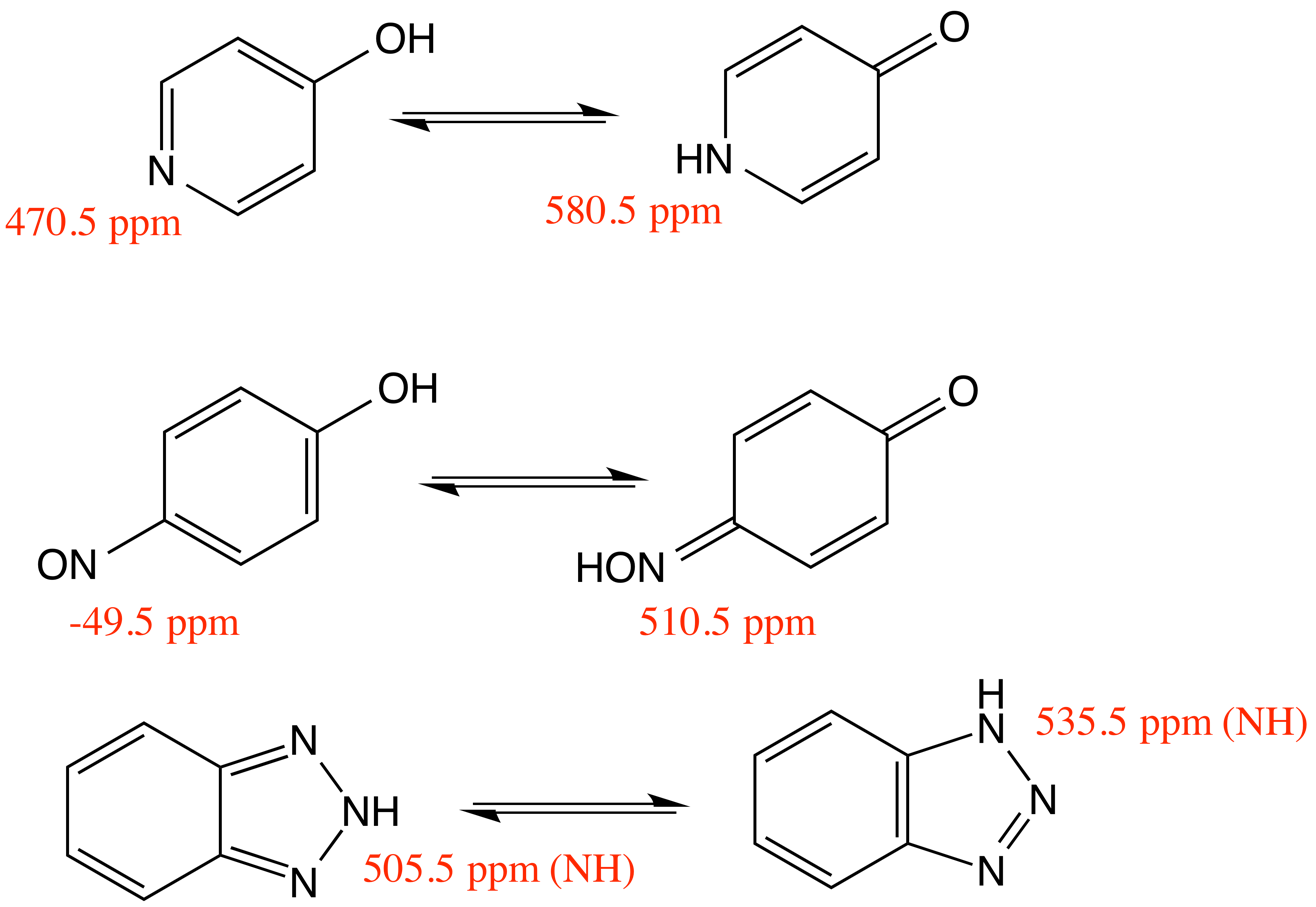
Example ^{15}N chemical shifts for tautomers undergoing tautomerization.

^{15}N NMR is used in a wide array of areas from biological to inorganic techniques. A famous application in organic synthesis is to utilize ^{15}N to monitor tautomerization equilibria in heteroaromatics because of the dramatic change in ^{15}N shifts between tautomers.

=== Protein NMR ===
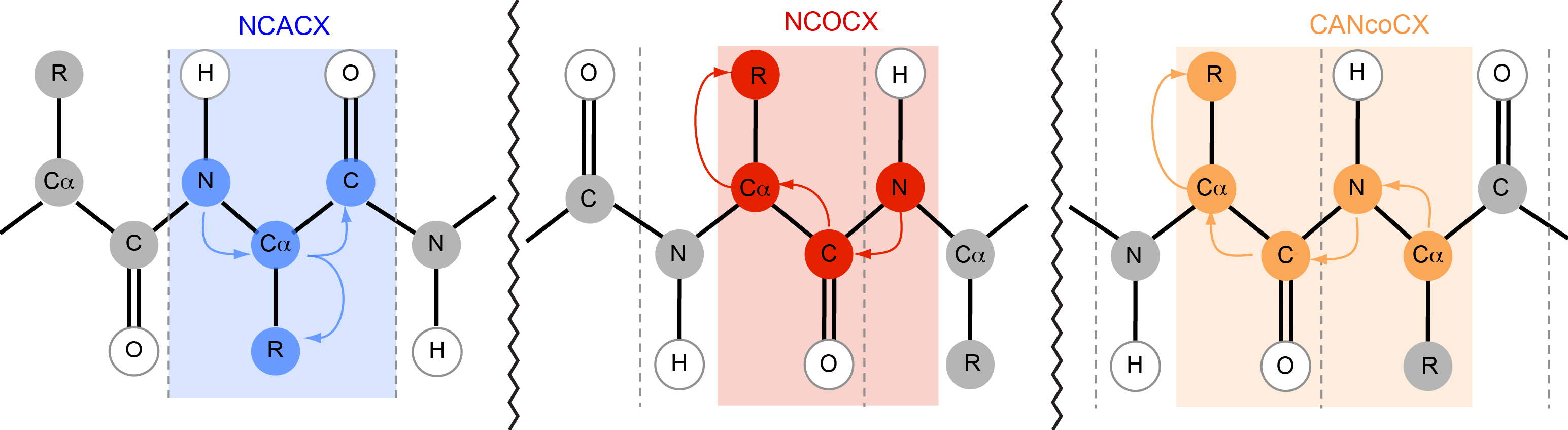
The ssNMR polarization pathways for the NCACX, NCOCX, and CANcoCX experiments respectively. In each case, all carbon and nitrogen atoms are either uniformly or partially isotopically labeled with ^{13}C and ^{15}N.

^{15}N NMR is also extremely valuable in protein NMR investigations. Most notably, the introduction of three-dimensional experiments with ^{15}N lifts the ambiguity in ^{13}C–^{13}C two-dimensional experiments. In solid-state nuclear magnetic resonance (ssNMR), for example, ^{15}N is most commonly utilized in NCACX, NCOCX, and CANcoCX pulse sequences.

=== Investigation of nitrogen-containing heterocycles ===
^{15}N NMR is the most effective method for investigation of structure of heterocycles with a high content of nitrogen atoms (tetrazoles, triazines and their annelated analogs). ^{15}N labeling followed by analysis of ^{13}C–^{15}N and ^{1}H–^{15}N couplings may be used for establishing structures and chemical transformations of nitrogen heterocycles.

== INEPT ==
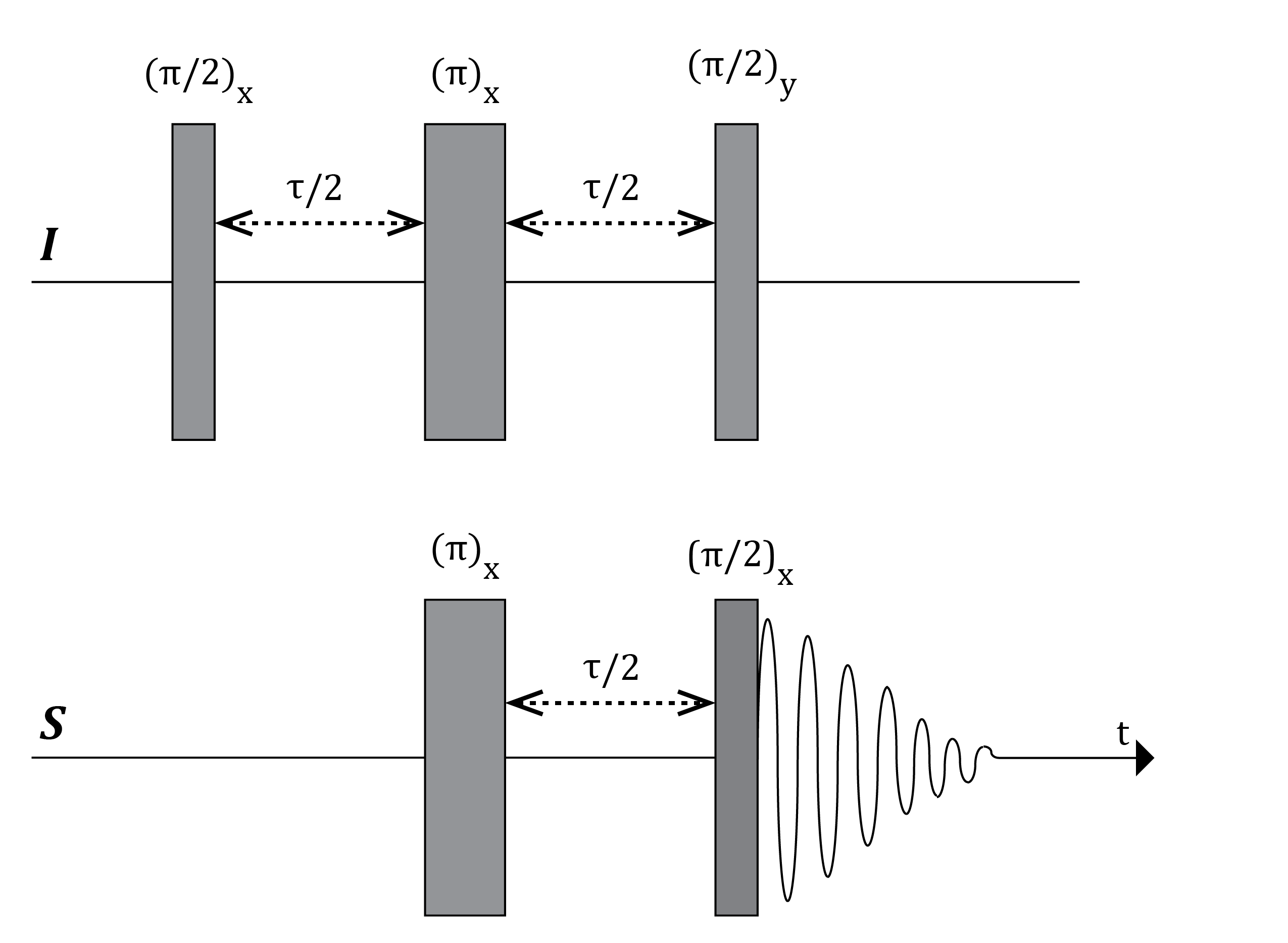
Graphical representation of the INEPT NMR pulse sequence. INEPT is utilized often to improve ^{^{15}}N resolution because it can accommodate negative gyromagnetic ratios, increases Boltzmann polarization, and decreases T_{1} relaxation.

Insensitive nuclei enhanced by polarization transfer (INEPT) is a signal resolution enhancement method. Because ^{15}N has a gyromagnetic ratio that is small in magnitude, the resolution is quite poor. A common pulse sequence which dramatically improves the resolution for ^{15}N is INEPT. The INEPT is an elegant solution in most cases because it increases the Boltzmann polarization and lowers T_{1} values (thus scans are shorter). Additionally, INEPT can accommodate negative gyromagnetic ratios, whereas the common nuclear Overhauser effect (NOE) cannot.

== See also ==
- Heteronuclear single quantum coherence spectroscopy (HSQC)
- Two-dimensional nuclear magnetic resonance spectroscopy
- Triple-resonance nuclear magnetic resonance spectroscopy
