= Dennis Torchia =

American biophysicist

Dennis Torchia is an American biophysicist who specialized in NMR spectroscopy. He spent most of his career at the National Institute of Dental and Craniofacial Research (NIDCR), part of the United States National Institutes of Health, where he served as Chief of the Structural Biology Unit before his retirement in 2006.

== Career ==
Torchia received his bachelor's degree from University of California, Riverside and his Ph.D. from Yale University. He worked as a postdoctoral fellow with Elkan Blout at Harvard University, briefly worked at Bell Laboratories and the National Institute of Standards and Technology, and joined NIDCR in 1974. He collaborated extensively with fellow NIH scientists Ad Bax, Marius Clore and Angela Gronenborn in the early development of multidimensional protein NMR, pioneered the use of isotopic labeling in the preparation of NMR samples, and developed techniques for studying protein dynamics.

Torchia assumed emeritus status in 2006, but has continued to publish reviews and retrospectives on the history of protein NMR. He received the Eastern Analytical Symposium Award for Outstanding Achievement in Nuclear Magnetic Resonance in 2013.
