= Collaborative Computing Project for NMR =

The CCPN logo.

The Collaborative Computing Project for NMR (CCPN) is a project that aims to bring together computational aspects of the scientific community involved in NMR spectroscopy, especially those who work in the field of protein NMR. The general aims are to link new and existing NMR software via a common data standard and provide a forum within the community for the discussion of NMR software and the scientific methods it supports. CCPN was initially started in 1999 in the United Kingdom but collaborates with NMR and software development groups worldwide.

== The Collaborative Project for the NMR Community ==
The Collaborative Computing project for NMR spectroscopy was set up in with three main aims; to create a common standard for representing NMR spectroscopy related data, to create a suite of new open-source NMR software packages and to arrange meetings for the NMR community, including conferences, workshops and courses in order to discuss and spread best-practice within the NMR community, for both computational and non-computational aspects. Primary financial support for CCPN comes from the BBSRC; the UK Biotechnology and Biological Sciences Research Council. CCPN is part of an array of collaborative computing projects (CCP) and follows in a similar vein to the successful and well-established CCP4 project for X-ray crystallography. CCPN is also supported by European Union grants, most recently as part of the Extend-NMR project; which links together several software producing groups from across Europe.

CCPN is governed by an executive committee which draws its members from academics throughout the UK NMR community. This committee is chosen at the CCPN Assembly Meeting where all UK based NMR groups may participate and vote. The day-to-day work of CCPN, including the organisation of meetings and software development, is handled by an informal working group, coordinated by Ernest Laue at the University of Cambridge, which comprises the core group of staff and developers, as well as a growing number of collaborators throughout the world who contribute to coordinated NMR software development.

== NMR Data Standards ==
The many different software packages available to the NMR spectroscopy community have traditionally employed a number of different data formats and standards to represent computational information. The inception of CCPN was partly to look at this situation and to develop a more unified approach. It was deemed that multiple, informally connected data standards not only made it more difficult for a user to move from one program to the next, but also adversely affected data fidelity, harvesting and database deposition. To this end CCPN has developed a common data standard for NMR, referred to as the CCPN data model, as well as software routines and libraries that allow access, manipulation and storage of the data. The CCPN system works alongside the Bio Mag Res Bank which continues to handle archiving NMR database depositions; the CCPN standard is for active data exchange and in-program manipulation.

Although NMR spectroscopy remains at the core of the data standard it naturally expands into other related areas of science that support and complement NMR. These include molecular and macromolecular description, three-dimensional biological structures, sample preparation, workflow management and software setup. The CCPN libraries are created using the principles of model-driven architecture and automatic code generation; the CCPN data model provides a specification for the automatic generation of APIs in multiple languages. To date CCPN provides APIs to its data model in Python, Java and C programming languages. Through its collaborations, CCPN continues to link new and existing software via its data standards. To enable interaction with as much external software as possible, CCPN has created a format conversion program. This allows data to enter from outside the CCPN scheme and provides a mechanism to translate between existing data formats. The open-source CcpNmr FormatConverter software was first released in 2005 and is available for download (from CCPN and SourceForge) but is also recently accessible as a web application.

== CCPN Software Suite ==
Three dimensional protein NMR spectra viewed with CCPN software. The illustrated spectra are from HNcoCA and HNCA experiments; used here to assign the sequence of amino acids in a protein chain.

As well as enabling data exchange, CCPN aims to develop software for processing, analysis and interpretation of macromolecular NMR data. To this end CCPN has created CcpNmr Analysis; a graphical program for spectrum visualisation, assignment and NMR data analysis. Here, the requirement was for a program that used a modern graphical user interface and could run on many types of computer. It would be supported and maintained by CCPN and would allow modification and extension, including for new NMR techniques. The first version of Analysis was released in 2005 and is now at version 2.1. Analysis is built directly on the CCPN data model and its design is partly inspired by the older ANSIG. and SPARKY programs, but it has continued to develop from the suggestions, requirements and computational contributions of its user community. Analysis is freely available to academic and non-profit institutions. Commercial users are required to subscribe to CCPN for a moderate fee. CCPN software, including Analysis, is available for download at the CCPN web site and is supported by an active JISC email discussion group.

== CCPN Meetings ==
Through its meetings CCPN provides a forum for the discussion of computational and experimental NMR techniques. The aim is to debate and spread best practice in the determination of macromolecular information, including structure, dynamics and biological chemistry. CCPN continues to arrange annual conferences for the UK NMR community (the current being the ninth) and a series of workshops to discuss and promote data standards. Because it is vital to the success of CCPN as a software project and as a coordinated NMR community, its software developers run courses to teach the use of CCPN software and its development framework. They also arrange visits to NMR groups to introduce the CCPN program suite and to gain an understanding of the requirements of users.

CCPN aims to enable young scientists to contribute to and attend its meetings. Conference fees are kept low when possible, using contributions that come from industrial sponsorships and software subscriptions.
