= Robert T. Clubb =

- Education: University of Wisconsin; University of Michigan
- Scientific career
- Fields: Biochemistry, structural biology
- Workplaces: University of California, Los Angeles
- Doctoral advisor: Gerhard Wagner; Martha L. Ludwig

Robert Thompson Clubb is an American biochemist who researches the structural biology of bacterial pathogenesis. He is a professor of chemistry, biochemistry, and molecular biology at the University of California, Los Angeles, where he also directs the Clubb Lab and co-directs the Nuclear Magnetic Resonance Core Technology Center.

== Early life and education ==
Robert Thompson Clubb was born to surgical nurse Vera Alice Thompson and Jerome M. Clubb a professor of history. Clubb has a sister. He earned a Bachelor of Science at University of Wisconsin.

Clubb completed a doctor of philosophy in biological chemistry at University of Michigan. His 1993 dissertation was titled Application and development of multi-dimensional NMR spectroscopic techniques to study protein structure in solution. Clubb's advisors and co-chairs of his thesis committee were Gerhard Wagner and Martha L. Ludwig. He received training in practical nuclear magnetic resonance spectroscopy from Venkataraman Thanabal. From 1993 to 1996, Clubb was a post-doctoral research fellow at the National Institutes of Health. His advisors were G. Marius Clore and Angela Gronenborn.

== Career ==
Clubb's research has focused on elucidating the structural and biochemical mechanisms that bacterial pathogens use to display virulence factors and acquire nutrients from their hosts. Beginning in the early 2000s, he investigated how Gram-positive bacteria assemble pili and wall teichoic acids, advancing understanding of bacterial adhesion and cell wall physiology. Since the 2010s, his work has also centered on the molecular basis of heme-iron acquisition from hemoglobin by pathogens like Staphylococcus aureus and Corynebacterium diphtheriae, and more recently, he has led efforts to discover antibiotics targeting virulence factor assembly pathways, including Sortase A and wall teichoic acid biosynthesis.

Clubb is a professor of chemistry, biochemistry, and molecular biology at University of California, Los Angeles. He is the lab director of the Clubb Lab and co-director and staff researcher at the Nuclear Magnetic Resonance (NMR) Core Technology Center (DOE).

== Personal life ==
Clubb is married to Joanna Hoffman Clubb. They reside in Culver City, California.
