= Cyana (disambiguation) =

Cyana is a genus of moths in the subfamily Arctiinae.

Cyana may also refer to:

- CYANA (software), a combined assignment and dynamics algorithm for NMR applications
- Another name for the ancient Greek diver Hydna of Scione
