= CCPN =

CCPN can refer to any one of the following:

- Collaborative Computing Project for NMR - A project for computational aspects NMR spectroscopy.
- Corpus Christi Terminal Railroad - Which has railroad reporting mark CCPN.
