= Nuclear magnetic resonance spectroscopy of proteins =

Field of structural biology

Nuclear magnetic resonance spectroscopy of proteins (usually abbreviated protein NMR) is a field of structural biology in which NMR spectroscopy is used to obtain information about the structure and dynamics of proteins, and also nucleic acids, and their complexes. The field was pioneered by Richard R. Ernst and Kurt Wüthrich at the ETH, and by Ad Bax, Marius Clore, Angela Gronenborn at the NIH, and Gerhard Wagner at Harvard University, among others. Structure determination by NMR spectroscopy usually consists of several phases, each using a separate set of highly specialized techniques. The sample is prepared, measurements are made, interpretive approaches are applied, and a structure is calculated and validated.

NMR involves the quantum-mechanical properties of the central core ("nucleus") of the atom. These properties depend on the local molecular environment, and their measurement provides a map of how the atoms are linked chemically, how close they are in space, and how rapidly they move with respect to each other. These properties are fundamentally the same as those used in the more familiar magnetic resonance imaging (MRI), but the molecular applications use a somewhat different approach, appropriate to the change of scale from millimeters (of interest to radiologists) to nanometers (bonded atoms are typically a fraction of a nanometer apart), a factor of a million. This change of scale requires much higher sensitivity of detection and stability for long term measurement. In contrast to MRI, structural biology studies do not directly generate an image, but rely on complex computer calculations to generate three-dimensional molecular models.

Currently most samples are examined in a solution in water, but methods are being developed to also work with solid samples. Data collection relies on placing the sample inside a powerful magnet, sending radio frequency signals through the sample, and measuring the absorption of those signals. Depending on the environment of atoms within the protein, the nuclei of individual atoms will absorb different frequencies of radio signals. Furthermore, the absorption signals of different nuclei may be perturbed by adjacent nuclei. This information can be used to determine the distance between nuclei. These distances in turn can be used to determine the overall structure of the protein.

A typical study might involve how two proteins interact with each other, possibly with a view to developing small molecules that can be used to probe the normal biology of the interaction ("chemical biology") or to provide possible leads for pharmaceutical use (drug development). Frequently, the interacting pair of proteins may have been identified by studies of human genetics, indicating the interaction can be disrupted by unfavorable mutations, or they may play a key role in the normal biology of a "model" organism like the fruit fly, yeast, the worm C. elegans, or mice. To prepare a sample, methods of molecular biology are typically used to make quantities of protein by recombinant expression and purification from bacteria. This also permits changing the isotopic composition of the molecule, which is desirable because the isotopes behave differently and provide methods for identifying overlapping NMR signals.

== Sample preparation ==
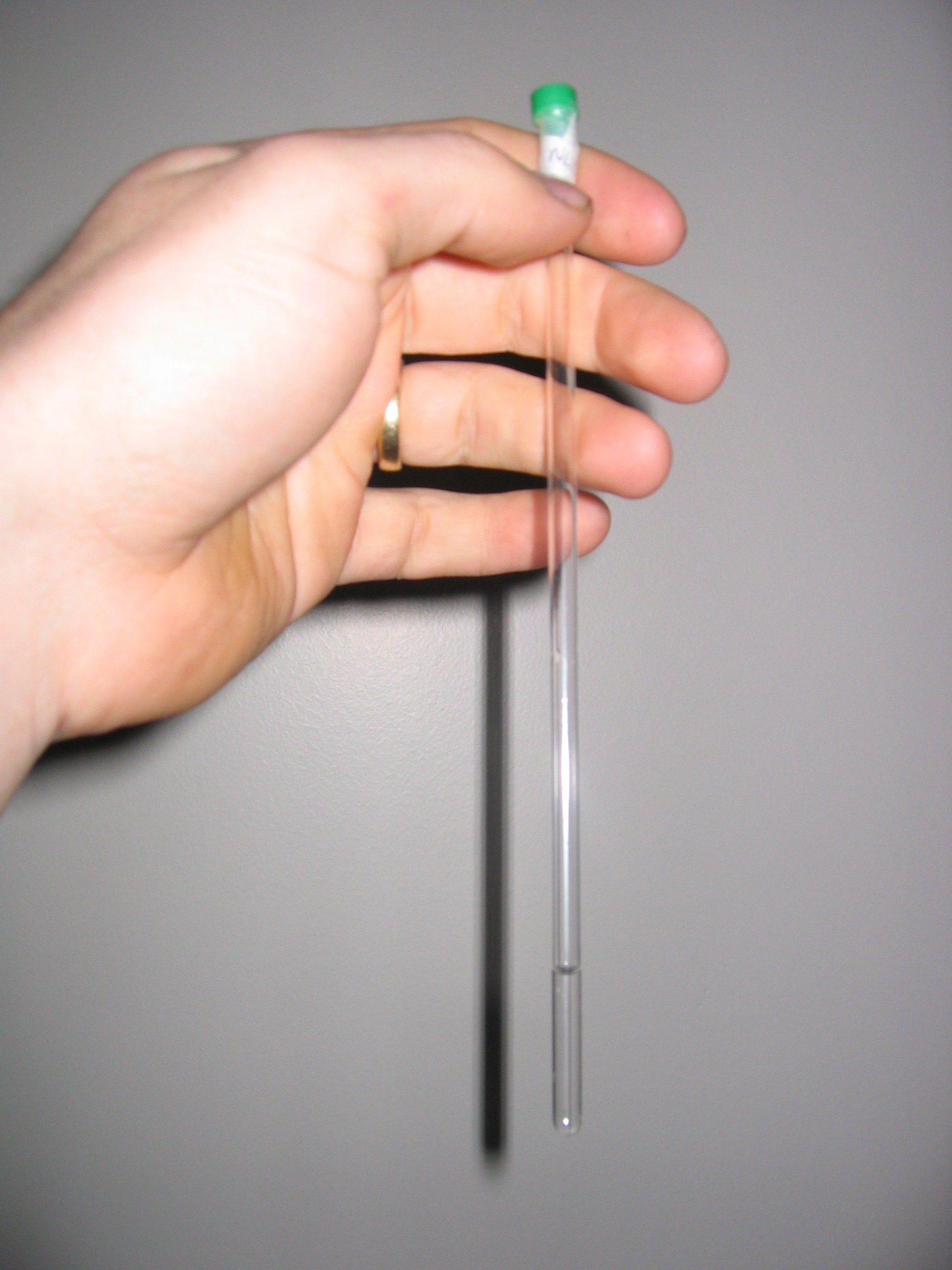
The NMR sample is prepared in a thin-walled glass tube.

Protein nuclear magnetic resonance is performed on aqueous samples of highly purified protein. Usually, the sample consists of between 300 and 600 microlitres with a protein concentration in the range 0.1 – 3 millimolar. The source of the protein can be either natural or produced in a production system using recombinant DNA techniques through genetic engineering. Recombinantly expressed proteins are usually easier to produce in sufficient quantity, and this method makes isotopic labeling possible.

The purified protein is usually dissolved in a buffer solution and adjusted to the desired solvent conditions. The NMR sample is prepared in a thin-walled glass tube.

== Data collection ==
Protein NMR utilizes multidimensional nuclear magnetic resonance experiments to obtain information about the protein. Ideally, each distinct nucleus in the molecule experiences a distinct electronic environment and thus has a distinct chemical shift by which it can be recognized. However, in large molecules such as proteins the number of resonances can typically be several thousand and a one-dimensional spectrum inevitably has incidental overlaps. Therefore, multidimensional experiments that correlate the frequencies of distinct nuclei are performed. The additional dimensions decrease the chance of overlap and have a larger information content, since they correlate signals from nuclei within a specific part of the molecule. Magnetization is transferred into the sample using pulses of electromagnetic (radiofrequency) energy and between nuclei using delays; the process is described with so-called pulse sequences. Pulse sequences allow the experimenter to investigate and select specific types of connections between nuclei. The array of nuclear magnetic resonance experiments used on proteins fall in two main categories — one where magnetization is transferred through the chemical bonds, and one where the transfer is through space, irrespective of the bonding structure. The first category is used to assign the different chemical shifts to a specific nucleus, and the second is primarily used to generate the distance restraints used in the structure calculation, and in the assignment with unlabelled protein.

Depending on the concentration of the sample, the magnetic field of the spectrometer, and the type of experiment, a single multidimensional nuclear magnetic resonance experiment on a protein sample may take hours or even several days to obtain suitable signal-to-noise ratio through signal averaging, and to allow for sufficient evolution of magnetization transfer through the various dimensions of the experiment. Other things being equal, higher-dimensional experiments will take longer than lower-dimensional experiments.

Typically, the first experiment to be measured with an isotope-labelled protein is a 2D heteronuclear single quantum correlation (HSQC) spectrum, where "heteronuclear" refers to nuclei other than 1H. In theory, the heteronuclear single quantum correlation has one peak for each H bound to a heteronucleus. Thus, in the 15N-HSQC, with a ^{15}N labelled protein, one signal is expected for each nitrogen atom in the back bone, with the exception of proline, which has no amide-hydrogen due to the cyclic nature of its backbone. Additional 15N-HSQC signals are contributed by each residue with a nitrogen-hydrogen bond in its side chain (W, N, Q, R, H, K). The 15N-HSQC is often referred to as the fingerprint of a protein because each protein has a unique pattern of signal positions. Analysis of the 15N-HSQC allows researchers to evaluate whether the expected number of peaks is present and thus to identify possible problems due to multiple conformations or sample heterogeneity. The relatively quick heteronuclear single quantum correlation experiment helps determine the feasibility of doing subsequent longer, more expensive, and more elaborate experiments. It is not possible to assign peaks to specific atoms from the heteronuclear single quantum correlation alone.

== Resonance assignment ==
In order to analyze the nuclear magnetic resonance data, it is important to get a resonance assignment for the protein, that is to find out which chemical shift corresponds to which atom. This is typically achieved by sequential walking using information derived from several different types of NMR experiment. The exact procedure depends on whether the protein is isotopically labelled or not, since a lot of the assignment experiments depend on carbon-13 and nitrogen-15.

Comparison of a COSY and TOCSY 2D spectra for an amino acid like glutamate or methionine. The TOCSY shows off diagonal crosspeaks between all protons in the spectrum, but the COSY only has crosspeaks between neighbours.

=== Homonuclear nuclear magnetic resonance ===
With unlabelled protein the usual procedure is to record a set of two-dimensional homonuclear nuclear magnetic resonance experiments through correlation spectroscopy (COSY), of which several types include conventional correlation spectroscopy, total correlation spectroscopy (TOCSY) and nuclear Overhauser effect spectroscopy (NOESY). A two-dimensional nuclear magnetic resonance experiment produces a two-dimensional spectrum. The units of both axes are chemical shifts. The COSY and TOCSY transfer magnetization through the chemical bonds between adjacent protons. The conventional correlation spectroscopy experiment is only able to transfer magnetization between protons on adjacent atoms, whereas in the total correlation spectroscopy experiment the protons are able to relay the magnetization, so it is transferred among all the protons that are connected by adjacent atoms. Thus in a conventional correlation spectroscopy, an alpha proton transfers magnetization to the beta protons, the beta protons transfers to the alpha and gamma protons, if any are present, then the gamma proton transfers to the beta and the delta protons, and the process continues. In total correlation spectroscopy, the alpha and all the other protons are able to transfer magnetization to the beta, gamma, delta, epsilon if they are connected by a continuous chain of protons. The continuous chain of protons are the sidechain of the individual amino acids. Thus these two experiments are used to build so called spin systems, that is build a list of resonances of the chemical shift of the peptide proton, the alpha protons and all the protons from each residue's sidechain. Which chemical shifts corresponds to which nuclei in the spin system is determined by the conventional correlation spectroscopy connectivities and the fact that different types of protons have characteristic chemical shifts. To connect the different spinsystems in a sequential order, the nuclear Overhauser effect spectroscopy experiment has to be used. Because this experiment transfers magnetization through space, it will show crosspeaks for all protons that are close in space regardless of whether they are in the same spin system or not. The neighbouring residues are inherently close in space, so the assignments can be made by the peaks in the NOESY with other spin systems.

One important problem using homonuclear nuclear magnetic resonance is overlap between peaks. This occurs when different protons have the same or very similar chemical shifts. This problem becomes greater as the protein becomes larger, so homonuclear nuclear magnetic resonance is usually restricted to small proteins or peptides.

=== Nitrogen-15 nuclear magnetic resonance ===
The most commonly performed 15N experiment is the ^{1}H-^{15}N HSQC. The experiment is highly sensitive and therefore can be performed relatively quickly. It is often used to check the suitability of a protein for structure determination using NMR, as well as for the optimization of the sample conditions. It is one of the standard suite of experiments used for the determination of the solution structure of protein. The HSQC can be further expanded into three- and four dimensional NMR experiments, such as ^{15}N-TOCSY-HSQC and ^{15}N-NOESY-HSQC.

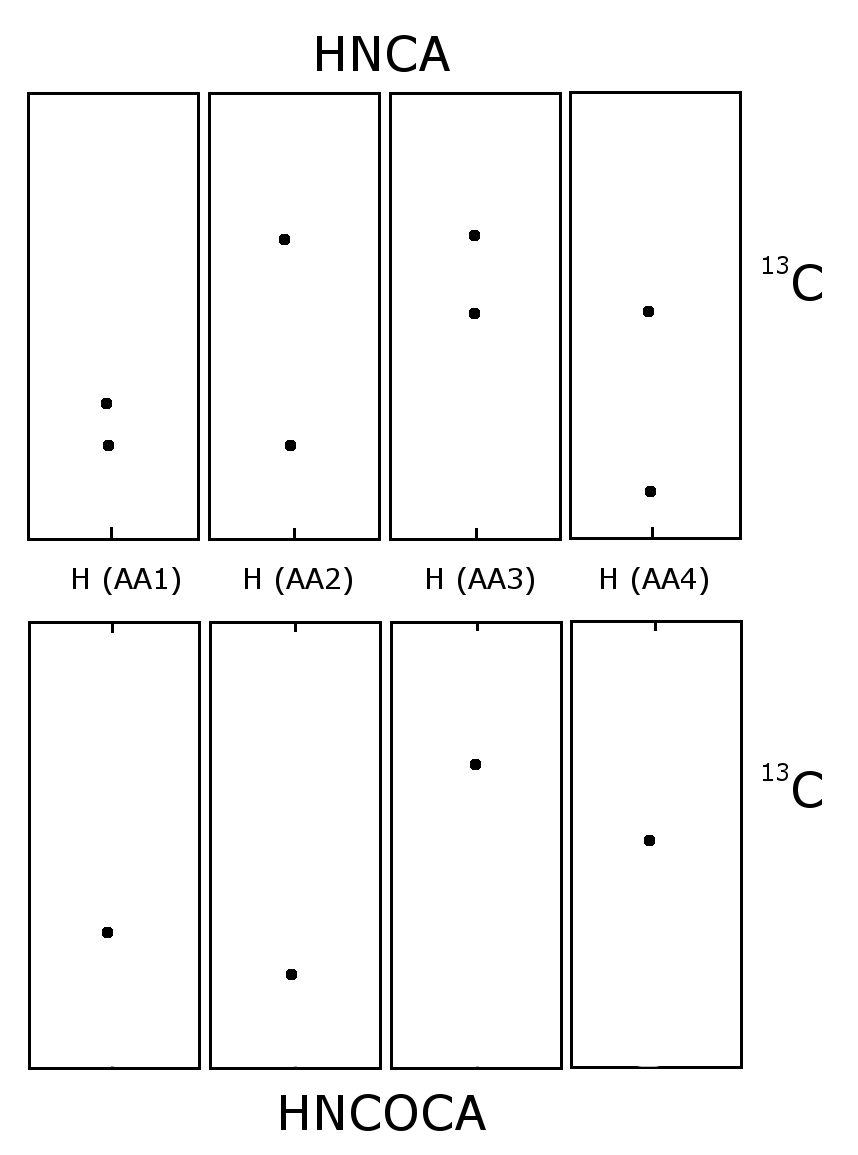
Schematic of an HNCA and HNCOCA for four sequential residues. The nitrogen-15 dimension is perpendicular to the screen. Each window is focused on the nitrogen chemical shift of that amino acid. The sequential assignment is made by matching the alpha carbon chemical shifts. In the HNCA each residue sees the alpha carbon of itself and the preceding residue. The HNCOCA only sees the alpha carbon of the preceding residue.

=== Carbon-13 and nitrogen-15 nuclear magnetic resonance ===
When the protein is labelled with carbon-13 and nitrogen-15 it is possible to record triple resonance experiments that transfer magnetisation over the peptide bond, and thus connect different spin systems through bonds. This is usually done using some of the following experiments, HNCO, HN(CA)CO}, HNCA, HN(CO)CA, HNCACB and CBCA(CO)NH. All six experiments consist of a ^{1}H-^{15}N plane (similar to a HSQC spectrum) expanded with a carbon dimension. In the HN(CA)CO, each H_{N} plane contains the peaks from the carbonyl carbon from its residue as well the preceding one in the sequence. The HNCO contains the carbonyl carbon chemical shift from only the preceding residue, but is much more sensitive than HN(CA)CO. These experiments allow each ^{1}H-^{15}N peak to be linked to the preceding carbonyl carbon, and sequential assignment can then be undertaken by matching the shifts of each spin system's own and previous carbons. The HNCA and HN(CO)CA works similarly, just with the alpha carbons (C_{α}) rather than the carbonyls, and the HNCACB and the CBCA(CO)NH contains both the alpha carbon and the beta carbon (C_{β}). Usually several of these experiments are required to resolve overlap in the carbon dimension. This procedure is usually less ambiguous than the NOESY-based method since it is based on through bond transfer. In the NOESY-based methods, additional peaks corresponding to atoms that are close in space but that do not belong to sequential residues will appear, confusing the assignment process. Following the initial sequential resonance assignment, it is usually possible to extend the assignment from the C_{α} and C_{β} to the rest of the sidechain using experiments such as HCCH-TOCSY, which is basically a TOCSY experiment resolved in an additional carbon dimension.

== Restraint generation ==
In order to make structure calculations, a number of experimentally determined restraints have to be generated. These fall into different categories; the most widely used are distance restraints and angle restraints.

=== Distance restraints ===
A crosspeak in a NOESY experiment signifies spatial proximity between the two nuclei in question. Thus each peak can be converted into a maximum distance between the nuclei, usually between 1.8 and 6 angstroms. The intensity of a NOESY peak is proportional to the distance to the minus 6th power, so the distance is determined according to the intensity of the peak. The intensity-distance relationship is not exact, so usually a distance range is used.

It is important to assign the NOESY peaks to the correct nuclei based on the chemical shifts. If this task is performed manually, it is usually very labor-intensive since proteins usually have thousands of NOESY peaks. Some computer programs such as PASD/XPLOR-NIH, UNIO, CYANA, ARIA/CNS, and AUDANA/PONDEROSA-C/S in the Integrative NMR platform perform this task automatically on manually pre-processed listings of peak positions and peak volumes, coupled to a structure calculation. Direct access to the raw NOESY data without the cumbersome need of iteratively refined peak lists is so far only granted by the PASD algorithm implemented in XPLOR-NIH, the ATNOS/CANDID approach implemented in the UNIO software package, and the PONDEROSA-C/S and thus indeed guarantees objective and efficient NOESY spectral analysis.

To obtain as accurate assignments as possible, it is a great advantage to have access to carbon-13 and nitrogen-15 NOESY experiments, since they help to resolve overlap in the proton dimension. This leads to faster and more reliable assignments, and in turn to better structures.

=== Angle restraints ===
In addition to distance restraints, restraints on the torsion angles of the chemical bonds, typically the psi and phi angles, can be generated. One approach is to use the Karplus equation, to generate angle restraints from coupling constants. Another approach uses the chemical shifts to generate angle restraints. Both methods use the fact that the geometry around the alpha carbon affects the coupling constants and chemical shifts, so given the coupling constants or the chemical shifts, a qualified guess can be made about the torsion angles.

=== Orientation restraints ===
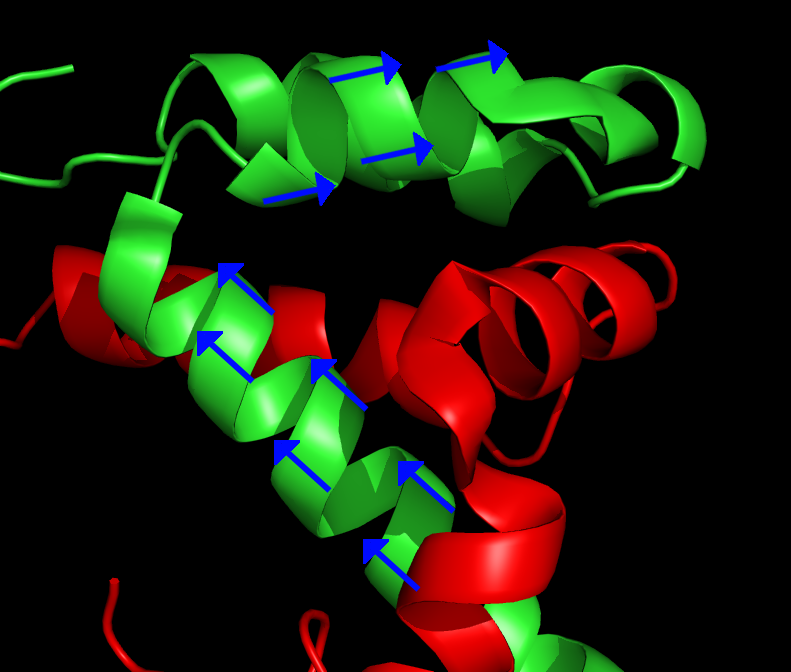
The blue arrows represent the orientation of the N – H bond of selected peptide bonds. By determining the orientation of a sufficient amount of bonds relative to the external magnetic field, the structure of the protein can be determined. From PDB record 1KBH

The analyte molecules in a sample can be partially ordered with respect to the external magnetic field of the spectrometer by manipulating the sample conditions. Common techniques include addition of bacteriophages or bicelles to the sample, or preparation of the sample in a stretched polyacrylamide gel. This creates a local environment that favours certain orientations of nonspherical molecules. Normally in solution NMR the dipolar couplings between nuclei are averaged out because of the fast tumbling of the molecule. The slight overpopulation of one orientation means that a residual dipolar coupling remains to be observed. The dipolar coupling is commonly used in solid state NMR and provides information about the relative orientation of the bond vectors relative to a single global reference frame. Typically the orientation of the N-H vector is probed in an HSQC-like experiment. Initially, residual dipolar couplings were used for refinement of previously determined structures, but attempts at de novo structure determination have also been made.

== Hydrogen–deuterium exchange ==
NMR spectroscopy is nucleus specific. Thus, it can distinguish between hydrogen and deuterium. The amide protons in the protein exchange readily with the solvent, and, if the solvent contains a different isotope, typically deuterium, the reaction can be monitored by NMR spectroscopy. How rapidly a given amide exchanges reflects its solvent accessibility. Thus amide exchange rates can give information on which parts of the protein are buried, hydrogen-bonded, etc. A common application is to compare the exchange of a free form versus a complex. The amides that become protected in the complex, are assumed to be in the interaction interface.

== Structure calculation ==
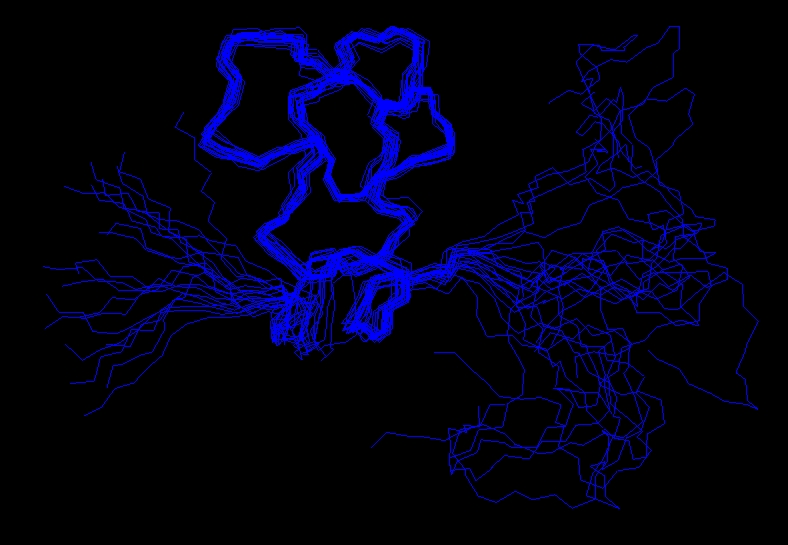
Nuclear magnetic resonance structure determination generates an ensemble of structures. The structures will converge only if the data is sufficient to dictate a specific fold. In these structures, it is the case for only a part of the structure. From PDB entry 1SSU.

The experimentally determined restraints can be used as input for the structure calculation process. Researchers, using computer programs such as XPLOR-NIH, CYANA, GeNMR, or RosettaNMR attempt to satisfy as many of the restraints as possible, in addition to general properties of proteins such as bond lengths and angles. The algorithms convert the restraints and the general protein properties into energy terms, and then try to minimize this energy. The process results in an ensemble of structures that, if the data were sufficient to dictate a certain fold, will converge.

== Structure validation ==
The ensemble of structures obtained is an "experimental model", i.e., a representation of certain kind of experimental data. To acknowledge this fact is important because it means that the model could be a good or bad representation of that experimental data. In general, the quality of a model will depend on both the quantity and quality of experimental data used to generate it and the correct interpretation of such data.

Every experiment has associated errors. Random errors will affect the reproducibility and precision of the resulting structures. If the errors are systematic, the accuracy of the model will be affected. The precision indicates the degree of reproducibility of the measurement and is often expressed as the variance of the measured data set under the same conditions. The accuracy, however, indicates the degree to which a measurement approaches its "true" value.

Ideally, a model of a protein will be more accurate the more fit the actual molecule that represents and will be more precise as there is less uncertainty about the positions of their atoms. In practice there is no "standard molecule" against which to compare models of proteins, so the accuracy of a model is given by the degree of agreement between the model and a set of experimental data. Historically, the structures determined by NMR have been, in general, of lower quality than those determined by X-ray diffraction. This is due, in part, to the lower amount of information contained in data obtained by NMR. Because of this fact, it has become common practice to establish the quality of NMR ensembles, by comparing it against the unique conformation determined by X-ray diffraction, for the same protein. However, the X-ray diffraction structure may not exist, and, since the proteins in solution are flexible molecules, a protein represented by a single structure may lead to underestimate the intrinsic variation of the atomic positions of a protein. A set of conformations, determined by NMR or X-ray crystallography may be a better representation of the experimental data of a protein than a unique conformation.

The utility of a model will be given, at least in part, by the degree of accuracy and precision of the model. An accurate model with relatively poor precision could be useful to study the evolutionary relationships between the structures of a set of proteins, whereas the rational drug design requires both precise and accurate models. A model that is not accurate, regardless of the degree of precision with which it was obtained will not be very useful.

Since protein structures are experimental models that can contain errors, it is very important to be able to detect these errors. The process aimed at the detection of errors is known as validation. There are several methods to validate structures, some are statistical like PROCHECK and WHAT IF while others are based on physical principles as CheShift, or a mixture of statistical and physics principles PSVS.

== Dynamics ==
In addition to structures, nuclear magnetic resonance can yield information on the dynamics of various parts of the protein. This usually involves measuring relaxation times such as T_{1} and T_{2} to determine order parameters, correlation times, and chemical exchange rates. NMR relaxation is a consequence of local fluctuating magnetic fields within a molecule. Local fluctuating magnetic fields are generated by molecular motions. In this way, measurements of relaxation times can provide information of motions within a molecule on the atomic level. In NMR studies of protein dynamics, the nitrogen-15 isotope is the preferred nucleus to study because its relaxation times are relatively simple to relate to molecular motions. This, however, requires isotope labeling of the protein. The T_{1} and T_{2} relaxation times can be measured using various types of HSQC-based experiments. The types of motions that can be detected are motions that occur on a time-scale ranging from about 10 picoseconds to about 10 nanoseconds. In addition, slower motions, which take place on a time-scale ranging from about 10 microseconds to 100 milliseconds, can also be studied. However, since nitrogen atoms are found mainly in the backbone of a protein, the results mainly reflect the motions of the backbone, which is the most rigid part of a protein molecule. Thus, the results obtained from nitrogen-15 relaxation measurements may not be representative of the whole protein. Therefore, techniques utilising relaxation measurements of carbon-13 and deuterium have recently been developed, which enables systematic studies of motions of the amino acid side-chains in proteins. A challenging and special case of study regarding dynamics and flexibility of peptides and full-length proteins is represented by disordered structures. Nowadays, it is an accepted concept that proteins can exhibit a more flexible behaviour known as disorder or lack of structure; however, it is possible to describe an ensemble of structures instead of a static picture representing a fully functional state of the protein. Many advances are represented in this field in particular in terms of new pulse sequences, technological improvement, and rigorous training of researchers in the field.

== NMR spectroscopy on large proteins ==
Traditionally, nuclear magnetic resonance spectroscopy has been limited to relatively small proteins or protein domains. This is in part caused by problems resolving overlapping peaks in larger proteins, but this has been alleviated by the introduction of isotope labelling and multidimensional experiments. Another more serious problem is the fact that in large proteins the magnetization relaxes faster, which means there is less time to detect the signal. This in turn causes the peaks to become broader and weaker, and eventually disappear. Two techniques have been introduced to attenuate the relaxation: transverse relaxation optimized spectroscopy (TROSY) and deuteration of proteins. By using these techniques it has been possible to study proteins in complex with the 900 kDa chaperone GroES-GroEL.

== Automation of the process ==
Structure determination by NMR has traditionally been a time-consuming process, requiring interactive analysis of the data by a highly trained scientist. There has been considerable interest in automating the process to increase the throughput of structure determination and to make protein NMR accessible to non-experts (See structural genomics). The two most time-consuming processes involved are the sequence-specific resonance assignment (backbone and side-chain assignment) and the NOE assignment tasks. Several different computer programs have been published that target individual parts of the overall NMR structure determination process in an automated fashion. Most progress has been achieved for the task of automated NOE assignment. So far, only the FLYA and the UNIO approach were proposed to perform the entire protein NMR structure determination process in an automated manner without any human intervention. Modules in the NMRFAM-SPARKY such as APES (two-letter-code: ae), I-PINE/PINE-SPARKY (two-letter-code: ep; I-PINE web server) and PONDEROSA (two-letter-code: c3, up; PONDEROSA web server) are integrated so that it offers full automation with visual verification capability in each step. Efforts have also been made to standardize the structure calculation protocol to make it quicker and more amenable to automation. Recently, the POKY suite, the successor of programs mentioned above, has been released to provide modern GUI tools and AI/ML features.

== See also ==
- NMR spectroscopy
- Nuclear magnetic resonance
- Nuclear magnetic resonance spectroscopy of carbohydrates
- Nuclear magnetic resonance spectroscopy of nucleic acids
- Protein crystallization
- Protein dynamics
- Relaxation (NMR)
- X-ray crystallography
