= Comparison of nuclear magnetic resonance software =

Comparison of software for processing NMR spectra.

Software	Author, creator	Operating system	First public release	Latest stable version	Cost in USD	License	External link
cuteNMR		Linux, macOS, Windows	November 9, 2010 (15 years ago)	0.1 alpha1 (November 9, 2010; 15 years ago)	Free	GPLv2	
GSim		Linux, Windows	August 22, 2006 (20 years ago)	21.3 (March 13, 2013; 13 years ago)	Free	GPLv2	
HQSpectrum	HQS Quantum Simulations	Browser bases	January, 2026	-	Free and subscription tiers	Proprietary	
matNMR	Jacco van Beek	Linux, Mac OS, Windows	1999 (27 years ago)	3.9.144 (November 21, 2015; 10 years ago)	Free	GPLv2	
Mnova	Mestrelab	Linux, Mac OS, Windows		16.0.0 (May 27, 2025; 15 months ago)	$150–5000 (subscription & perpetual)	Proprietary	
NMRPipe	Frank Delaglio	Unix, Windows with SFU	1995 (31 years ago)	12.2 (July 29, 2025; 13 months ago)	Free	Free	
OpenVnmrJ	Dan Iverson	Linux, Mac OS	September 2016 (10 years ago)	3.2A (September 23, 2024; 23 months ago)	Free	Apache 2.0	
rNMR	Ian A. Lewis, Seth C. Schommer	Linux, macOS, Windows	October 13, 2009 (16 years ago)	1.1.9 (February 9, 2015; 11 years ago)	Free	GPLv3	
SpinWorks		Linux, Mac OS, Windows	~1999 (27 years ago)	4.2.13 (November 17, 2025; 9 months ago)	Free	Free	
TARQUIN		Linux, macOS, Windows	February 17, 2008 (18 years ago)	4.3.10 (June 16, 2017; 9 years ago)	Free	GPLv2	
TopSpin	Bruker	Linux, Mac OS, Windows		4.5.0 (July 31, 2025; 13 months ago)	Free (for academia)	Proprietary	
vnmr	Varian, Inc.	Unix					
