= Ad Bax =

Dutch biophysicist (born 1956)

Adriaan (Ad) Bax
- Born: Netherlands
- Education: Delft University of Technology
- Known for: Methods development for NMR, such as RDCs (Residual dipolar coupling)
- Awards: Bijvoet Medal of the Bijvoet Center for Biomolecular Research (1993) E. Bright Wilson Award (2000); National Academy of Sciences (2002); American Academy of Arts and Sciences (2002); Welch Award in Chemistry (2018); NAS Award for Scientific Reviewing (2018) Foreign Member of the Royal Society (2024)
- Scientific career
- Fields: Nuclear magnetic resonance, biophysics
- Institutions: NIDDK, National Institutes of Health
- Thesis: Two-Dimensional Nuclear Magnetic Resonance in Liquids (1981)
- Doctoral advisor: Ray Freeman and Toon Mehlkopf
- Notable students: Michael F. Summers
- Website: spin.niddk.nih.gov/bax

Adriaan "Ad" Bax (born 1956) is a Dutch-American molecular biophysicist who is a Distinguished Investigator at the National Institutes of Health. He is the Chief of the Section on Biophysical NMR Spectroscopy in the Laboratory of Chemical Physics at the National Institute of Diabetes and Digestive and Kidney Diseases. He is known for his work on the methodology of biomolecular NMR spectroscopy. He is a corresponding member of the Royal Netherlands Academy of Arts and Sciences, a Member of the National Academy of Sciences, a Fellow of the American Academy of Arts and Sciences, and a Foreign Member of the Royal Society.

== Biography ==
Bax was born in the Netherlands. He studied at Delft University of Technology where he got his engineer's degree (Ir. degree) in 1978 and his Ph.D. degree in Applied Physics in 1981, after spending considerable time working with Ray Freeman at Oxford University. He continued as a postdoc with Gary Maciel in the National Solid-State facility at Colorado State University, before joining the NIH's Laboratory of Chemical Physics in 1983. In 1994 he became Correspondent of the Royal Netherlands Academy of Arts and Sciences. In 2002 he was elected a Member of the National Academy of Sciences in the section on Biophysics and computational biology and a Fellow of the American Academy of Arts and Sciences. Bax was awarded the 2018 NAS Award for Scientific Reviewing in structural biology and the 2018 Welch Award in Chemistry. He was elected a Foreign Member of the Royal Society in 2024.

== Work in NMR spectroscopy ==
Bax works in the field of biomolecular NMR spectroscopy and has been a leader in the development of what have become today's standard methods in the field. He collaborated extensively with fellow NIH scientists Marius Clore, Angela Gronenborn and Dennis Torchia in the development of multidimensional protein NMR. Bax pioneered the development of triple resonance experiments and technology for resonance assignment of isotopically enriched proteins. Together with Torchia and Lewis E. Kay, he developed the now widely adopted methods for studying atomic motions in proteins. Bax also pioneered the use of residual dipolar couplings and chemical shifts for determining DNA and protein structures. Much of his recent work focuses on the use of rapid jumps in pressure inside the NMR sample cell to study mechanisms of protein folding and misfolding, the latter of potential importance to amyloid diseases. He was the world's most cited chemist over two decades (1981-1997).

== Work on human-generated aerosols ==
Using laser light scattering, Bax proposed that speech-generated aerosols are likely a dominant SARS-CoV-2 transmission mode, demonstrating that speech aerosols remain airborne much longer than was widely believed hitherto. His group also developed novel technologies for capturing exhaled breath particles in a manner that enables quantitative chemical analysis of lung fluid by NMR and mass spectrometry.
