= Triple-resonance nuclear magnetic resonance spectroscopy =

Triple resonance experiments are a set of multi-dimensional nuclear magnetic resonance spectroscopy (NMR) experiments that link three types of atomic nuclei, most typically consisting of ^{1}H, ^{15}N and ^{13}C. These experiments are often used to assign specific resonance signals to specific atoms in an isotopically-enriched protein. The technique was first described in papers by Ad Bax, Mitsuhiko Ikura and Lewis Kay in 1990, and further experiments were then added to the suite of experiments. Many of these experiments have since become the standard set of experiments used for sequential assignment of NMR resonances in the determination of protein structure by NMR. They are now an integral part of solution NMR study of proteins, and they may also be used in solid-state NMR.

== Background ==
There are two main methods of determining protein structure on the atomic level. The first of these is by X-ray crystallography, starting in 1958 when the crystal structure of myoglobin was determined. The second method is by NMR, which began in the 1980s when Kurt Wüthrich outlined the framework for NMR structure determination of proteins and solved the structure of small globular proteins. The early method of structural determination of protein by NMR relied on proton-based homonuclear NMR spectroscopy in which the size of the protein that may be determined is limited to ~10 KDa. This limitation is due to the need to assign NMR signals from the large number of nuclei in the protein – in larger protein, the greater number of nuclei results in overcrowding of resonances, and the increasing size of the protein also broadens the signals, making resonance assignment difficult. These problems may be alleviated by using heteronuclear NMR spectroscopy which allows the proton spectrum to be edited with respect to the ^{15}N and ^{13}C chemical shifts, and also reduces the overlap of resonances by increasing the number of dimensions of the spectrum. In 1990, Ad Bax and coworkers developed the triple resonance technology and experiments on proteins isotopically labelled with ^{15}N and ^{13}C, with the result that the spectra are dramatically simplified, greatly facilitating the process of resonance assignment, and increasing the size of the protein that may be determined by NMR.

These triple resonance experiments utilize the relatively large magnetic couplings between certain pairs of nuclei to establish their connectivity. Specifically, the ^{1}J_{NH}, ^{1}J_{CH}, ^{1}J_{CC}, and ^{1}J_{CN} couplings are used to establish the scalar connectivity pathway between nuclei. The magnetization transfer process takes place through multiple, efficient one-bond magnetization transfer steps, rather than a single step through the smaller and variable ^{3}J_{HH} couplings. The relatively large size and good uniformity of the one-bond couplings allowed the design of efficient magnetization transfer schemes that are effectively uniform across a given protein, nearly independent of conformation. Triple resonance experiments involving ^{31}P may also be use for nucleic acid studies.

== Suite of experiments ==
Sequential assignment using triple resonance experiments
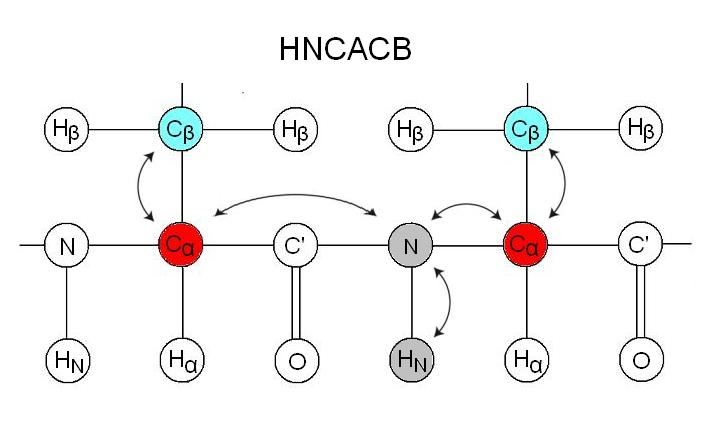
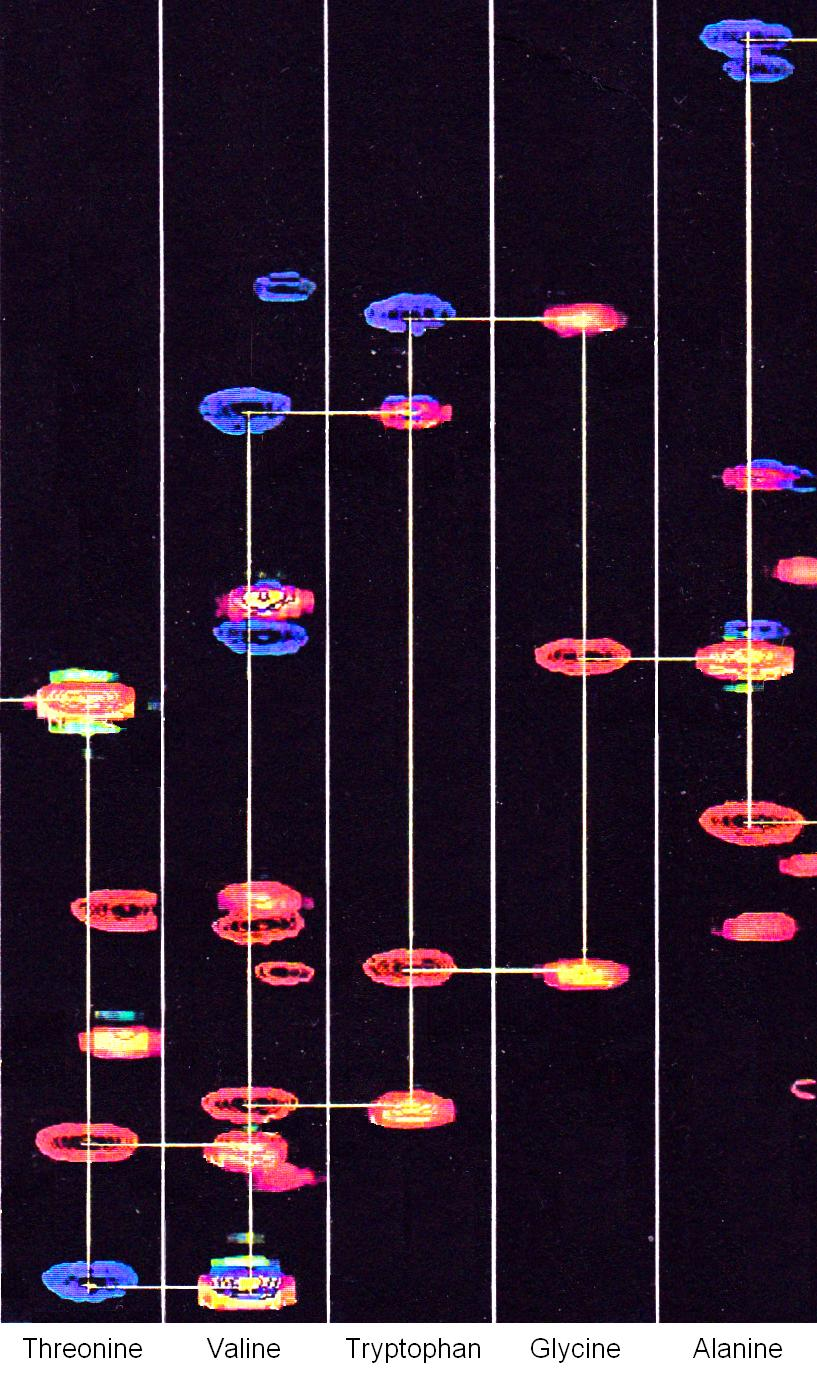
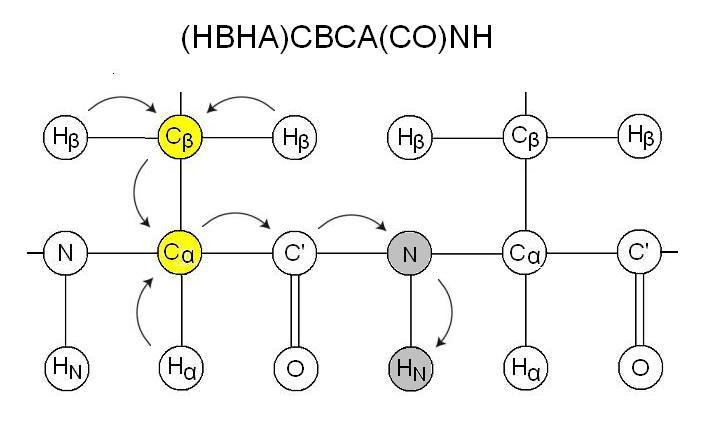
The top and bottom figures show the magnetization transfer pathway with the atoms that appear as peaks highlighted. The middle figure shows how the peaks appear in spectra, here presented as an overlay of strips of HNCACB and CBCA(CO)NH spectra. Peaks from CBCA(CO)NH are in intensity plot and colored yellow; they identify the resonances of the preceding Cα and Cβ. HNCACB is in contour plot and usually shows 4 peaks for each strip, two each from a residue and its preceding one. The red peaks are for Cα, and blue peaks for Cβ. Here the blue Cβ peaks of threonine and alanine are distinctive and easily identifiable, while glycine which lacks a Cβ gives only a single peak. Other residue types however may not be as easy to distinguish.

These experiments are typically named by the nuclei (H, N, and C) involved in the experiment. CO refers to the carbonyl carbon, while CA and CB refer to Cα and Cβ respectively, similarly HA and HB for Hα and Hβ (see diagram for examples of experiments). The nuclei in the name are ordered in the same sequence as in the path of magnetization transfer, those nuclei placed within parentheses are involved in the magnetization transfer pathway but are not recorded. For reason of sensitivity, these experiments generally start on a proton and end on a proton, typically via INEPT and reverse INEPT steps. Therefore, many of these experiments are what may be called "out-and-back" experiments where, although not indicated in the name, the magnetization is transferred back to the starting proton for signal acquisition.

Some of the experiments are used in tandem for the resonance assignment of protein, for example HNCACB may be used together with CBCA(CO)NH as a pair of experiments. Not all of these experiments need to be recorded for sequential assignment (it can be done with as few as two), however extra pairs of experiments are useful for independent assessment of the correctness of the assignment, and the redundancy of information may be necessary when there is ambiguity in the assignments. Other experiments are also necessary to fully assign the side chain resonances.

TROSY versions of many of these experiments exist for improvement in sensitivity. Triple resonance experiments can also be used in sequence-specific backbone resonance assignment of magic angle spinning NMR spectra in solid-state NMR.

A large number triple-resonance NMR experiments have been created, and the experiments listed below is not meant to be exhaustive.

=== HNCO ===
The experiment provides the connectivities between the amide of a residue with the carbonyl carbon of the preceding residues. It is the most sensitive of the triple resonance experiments. The sidechains carboxamides of asparagine and glutamine are also visible in this experiment. Additionally, the guanidino group of arginine, which has similar coupling constant to the carboxamide group, may also appear in this spectrum. This experiment is sometimes used together with HN(CA)CO.

=== HN(CA)CO ===
Here, the amide resonance of a residue is correlated with the carbonyl carbon of the same residue, as well as that of the preceding residue. The intra-residue resonances are usually stronger than the inter-residues one.

=== HN(CO)CA ===
This experiment correlates the resonances of the amide of a residue with the Cα of the preceding residue. This experiment is often used together with HNCA.

=== HNCA ===
This experiment correlates the chemical shift of amide of a residue the Cα of the same residue as well as those of the preceding residue. Each strip gives two peaks, the inter and intra-residue Cα peaks. Peak from the preceding Cα may be identified from the HN(CO)CA experiment which gives only the inter-residue Cα.

=== CBCA(CO)NH ===
CBCA(CO)NH, or alternatively HN(CO)CACB, correlates the resonances of the amide of a residue with the Cα and Cβ of the preceding residue. Two peaks corresponding to the Cα and Cβ are therefore visible for each residue. This experiment is normally used together with HNCACB. The sidechain carboxamide of glutamines and asparagines also appear in this spectra in this experiment. CBCA(CO)NH is sometimes more precisely called (HBHA)CBCA(CO)NH as it starts with aliphatic protons and ends on an amide proton, and is therefore not an out-and-back experiment like HN(CO)CACB.

=== HNCACB ===
HNCACB, or alternatively CBCANH, correlates the chemical shift of amide of a residue the Cα and Cβ of the same residue as well as those of the preceding residue. In each strip, four peaks may be visible – 2 from the same residue and 2 from the preceding residue. Peaks from the preceding residue are usually weaker, and may be identified using CBCA(CO)NH. In this experiment, the Cα and Cβ peaks are in opposite phase, i.e. if Cα appears as a positive peak, then Cβ will be negative, making identification of Cα and Cβ straightforward. The extra information of Cβ from the CBCA(CO)NH/HNCACB set of experiments makes identification of residue type easier than HN(CO)CA/HNCA, however the HNCACB is a less sensitive experiment and may be unsuitable for some proteins.

The CBCANH experiment is less suitable for larger protein as it is more susceptible to the line-width problem than HNCACB.

=== CBCACO(CA)HA ===
This experiment provides the connectivities between the Cα and Cβ with the carbonyl carbon and Hα atoms within the same residue. The sidechain carboxyl group of aspartate and glutamate may appear weakly in this spectrum.

=== CC(CO)NH ===
This experiment provides connectivities between the amide of a residue and the aliphatic carbon atoms of the preceding residue.

=== H(CCO)NH ===
This experiment provides connectivities between the amide of a residue and the hydrogen atoms attached to the aliphatic carbon of the preceding residue.

=== HBHA(CO)NH ===
This experiment correlates the amide resonance to the Hα and Hβ of the preceding residue.

== Sequential assignment ==
Pairs of experiments are normally used for sequential assignment, for example, the HNCACB and CBCA(CO)NH pair, or HNCA and HNC(CO)CA. The spectra are normally analyzed as strips of peaks, and strips from the pair of experiments may be presented together side by side or as an overlay of two spectra. In the HNCACB spectra 4 peaks are usually present in each strip, the Cα and Cβ of one residue as well as those of its preceding residue. The peaks from the preceding residue can be identified from the CBCA(CO)NH experiment. Each strip of peaks can therefore be linked to the next strip of peaks from an adjoining residue, allowing the strips to be connected sequentially. The residue type can be identified from the chemical shifts of the peaks, some, such as serine, threonine, glycine and alanine, are much easier to identify than others. The resonances can then be assigned by comparing the sequence of peaks with the amino acid sequence of the protein.
