= HNCA experiment =

NMR experiment

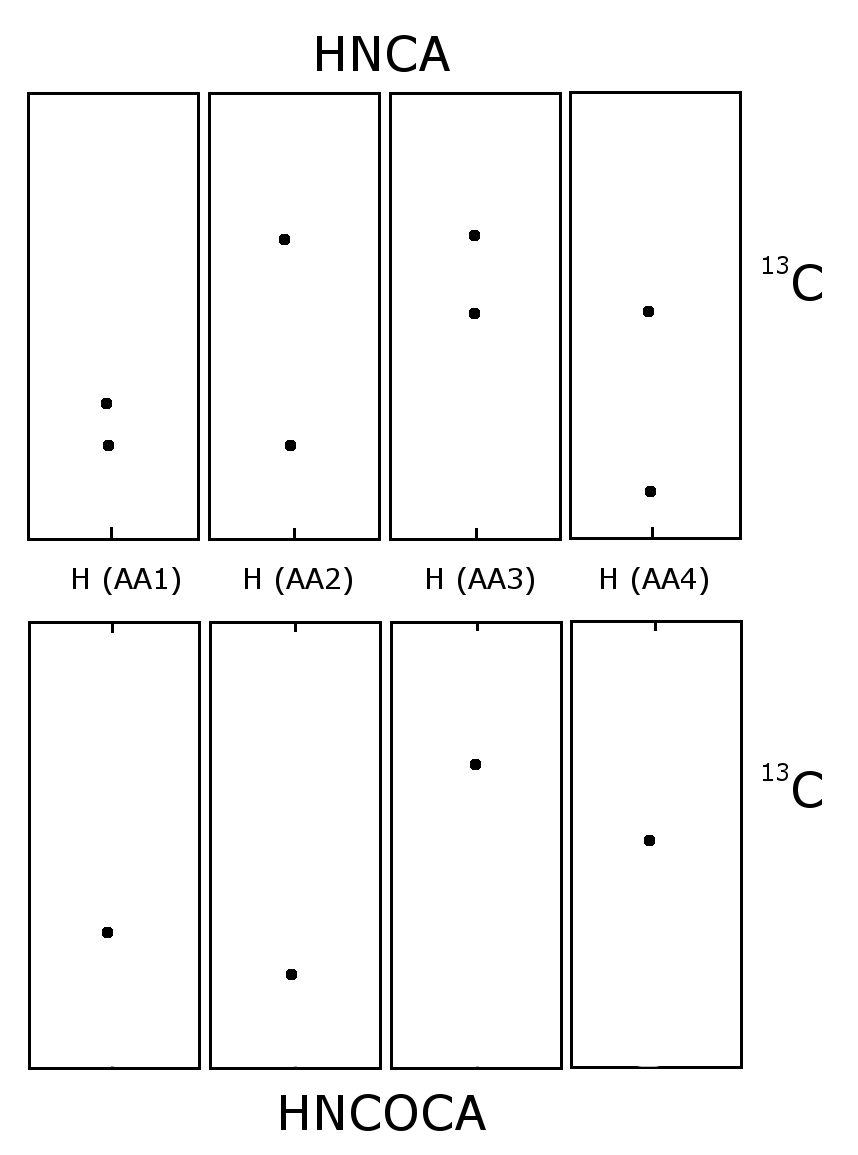
Schematic of an HNCA and HNCOCA for four sequential residues. The nitrogen-15 dimension is perpendicular to the screen. Each window is focused on the nitrogen chemical shift of that amino acid. The sequential assignment is made by matching the alpha carbon chemical shifts.

HNCA is a 3D triple-resonance NMR experiment commonly used in the field of protein NMR. The name derives from the experiment's magnetization transfer pathway: The magnetization of the amide proton of an amino acid residue is transferred to the amide nitrogen, and then to the alpha carbons of both the starting residue and the previous residue in the protein's amino acid sequence. In contrast, the complementary HNCOCA experiment transfers magnetization only to the alpha carbon of the previous residue. The HNCA experiment is used, often in tandem with HNCOCA, to assign alpha carbon resonance signals to specific residues in the protein. This experiment requires a purified sample of protein prepared with ^{13}C and ^{15}N isotopic labelling, at a concentration greater than 0.1 mM, and is thus generally only applied to recombinant proteins.

The spectrum produced by this experiment has 3 dimensions: A proton axis, a ^{15}N axis and a ^{13}C axis. For residue i peaks will appear at {H_{N}(i), N(i), C_{alpha} (i)} and {H_{N}(i), N(i), C_{alpha}(i-1)}, while for the complementary HNCOCA experiment peaks appear only at {H_{N}(i), N(i), C_{alpha}(i-1)}. Together, these two experiments reveal the alpha carbon chemical shift for each amino acid residue in a protein, and provide information linking adjacent residues in the protein's sequence.
