= CheShift =

CheShift-2
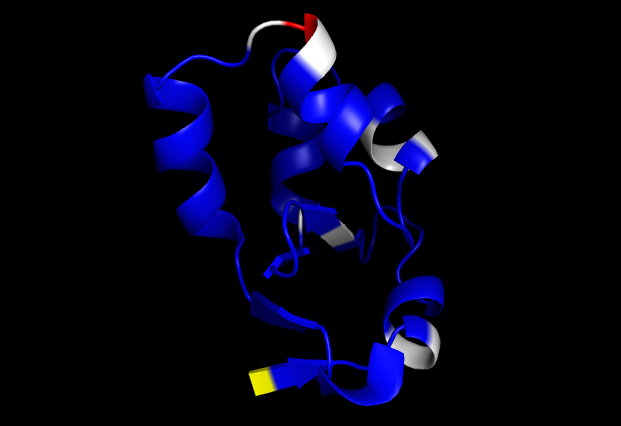
- Stable release: 3.0 / 1 September 2013
- Written in: Python, HTML
- Operating system: Cross-platform
- Available in: English
- Type: Bioinformatics
- License: Free of charge for academic use
- Website: cheshift.com
- Repository: github.com/aloctavodia/cheshift

CheShift (pronounced /tʃeʃɪft/) is a bioinformatics software tool used for the prediction of protein nuclear magnetic resonance (NMR) chemical shifts and the validation of protein structures. The software operates as a web server and as a plugin for the molecular graphics program PyMOL. It is primarily used to assess the quality of experimentally determined or computationally predicted protein models by comparing their theoretical chemical shifts with observed values.

== Principle ==
The core principle of CheShift is based on quantum mechanics calculations. It predicts the chemical shifts of carbon atoms in the protein backbone (^{13}C^{α} and ^{13}C^{β}) as a function of the torsional angles (φ, ψ, ω and χ^{1}, χ^{2}) of the 20 amino acids.

== Versions ==
The original CheShift server was introduced in 2009. In 2012, an updated version named CheShift-2 was released. This version introduced several key improvements, including the prediction of ^{13}C^{β} chemical shifts in addition to the original ^{13}C^{α} shifts, providing more data for validation.

=== CheShift-2 ===
CheShift-2 can return a list of theoretical chemical shift values from a PDB file. It also can display a 3D protein model based on an uploaded PDB file and chemical shift values. The 3D protein model is colored using a five color code indicating the differences of the theoretical vs the observed chemical shifts values. The differences between observed and predicted ^{13}C^{α} and ^{13}C^{β} chemical shifts can be used as a sensitive probe with which to detect possible local flaws in protein structures. If both ^{13}C^{α} and ^{13}C^{β} observed chemical shifts are provided CheShift-2 will attempt to provide a list of alternative χ1 and χ2 side-chain torsional angles that will reduce the differences between observed and computed chemical shifts, these values can be used to repair flaws in protein structures.

CheShift-2 can be accessed online or via PyMOL plugin.

=== Related software ===
- WHAT IF software
- PROCHECK
- PSVS

== See also ==
- Structure validation
- Bioinformatics
- Computational biology
