= ST2-PT =

ST2-PT (Single Transition-to-single Transition Polarization Transfer) is a method of sensitivity enhancement in NMR spectroscopy, developed by K.V. Pervushin, G. Wider, and K. Wüthrich in 1998. This method affords a √2 sensitivity enhancement for kinetically stable amide 15N–1H groups in proteins.
