= Julie Forman-Kay =

Canadian scientist

Julie Forman-Kay FRSC FRS
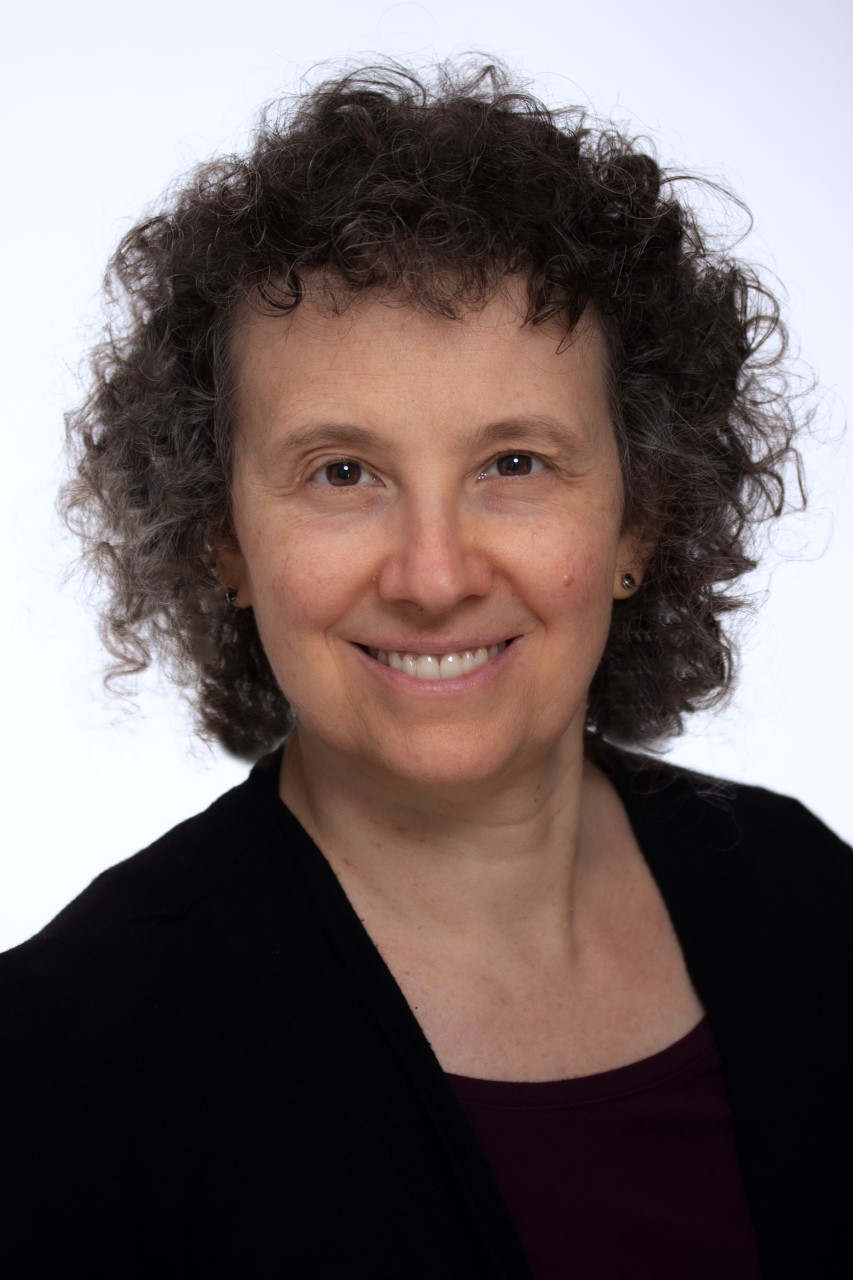
- Education: Massachusetts Institute of Technology; Yale University
- Known for: Intrinsically disordered proteins
- Scientific career
- Workplaces: University of Toronto; Hospital for Sick Children (Toronto)

Julie Forman-Kay FRSC FRS is a scientist at the Hospital for Sick Children (SickKids) and professor at University of Toronto. Her research focuses on the dynamics, interactions, structures, and functions of intrinsically disordered proteins.

== Early life and career ==
Forman-Kay obtained a degree in chemistry from the Massachusetts Institute of Technology in 1985. She carried out her graduate studies at Yale University in the laboratory of Frederic M. Richards. She also worked at the National Institutes of Health in the lab of Angela Gronenborn and Marius Clore.

Forman-Kay joined the Hospital for Sick Children in 1992, where she is currently a Program Head and Senior Scientist and Senior Scientist in the Molecular Medicine program. Furthermore she is also the Co-Director of the Structural & Biophysical Core Facility. Forman-Kay is also currently a Professor in the Department of Biochemistry, at University of Toronto.

== Research ==
Forman-Kay's research focuses on structural, functional, and bioinformatic studies of intrinsically disordered proteins using a combination of computational and experimental approaches. Her research has characterised the dynamic complexes of many disordered proteins and their ability to undergo liquid-liquid phase separation. Forman-Kay has developed a software tool called ENSEMBLE which uses experimental data from Nuclear Magnetic Resonance spectroscopy and Small-angle X-ray scattering to predict the conformations that represent the structural ensembles of disordered proteins.

== Awards ==
In 2016, Forman-Kay was elected as Fellow of the Royal Society of Canada in 2016.

In 2021, Forman-Kay was elected as a Fellow of the Royal Society.

== Personal life ==
Forman-Kay is married to biochemist Lewis Kay and has two children. Forman-Kay is also a violinist and plays classical chamber music.
