= Janin Plot =

Data visualisation for protein structure

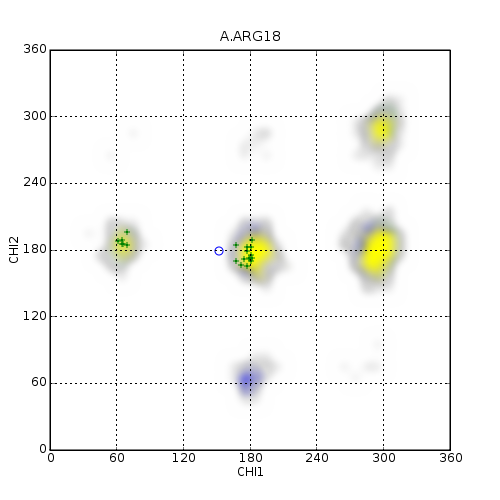
A Janin plot generated by CING from chain A, Arginine residue number 18 in the protein Dynein Light Chain, (PDB ID 1y4o). The blue region show likely angle combinations for helical residues, while the yellow areas display regions that are common to strand-like stretches. Some green background can be seen for residues that are in other types of regions.

In biochemistry, a Janin plot, like a Ramachandran plot, is a way to visualize dihedral angle distributions in protein structures. While a Ramachandran plot relates the two backbone dihedral angles, a Janin plot relates the first side chain dihedral angle χ-1 against χ-2. Because not all amino acids have these dihedral angles, a Janin plot is not applicable to all such acids.

This correlation is different for the various amino acids and can depend on the type of secondary structure (Helix, Sheet, etc.) local to that residue. The plot is named for Joël Janin, who studied these correlations in 1978 with Shoshana Wodak.
