= Kurt Wüthrich =

Swiss chemist

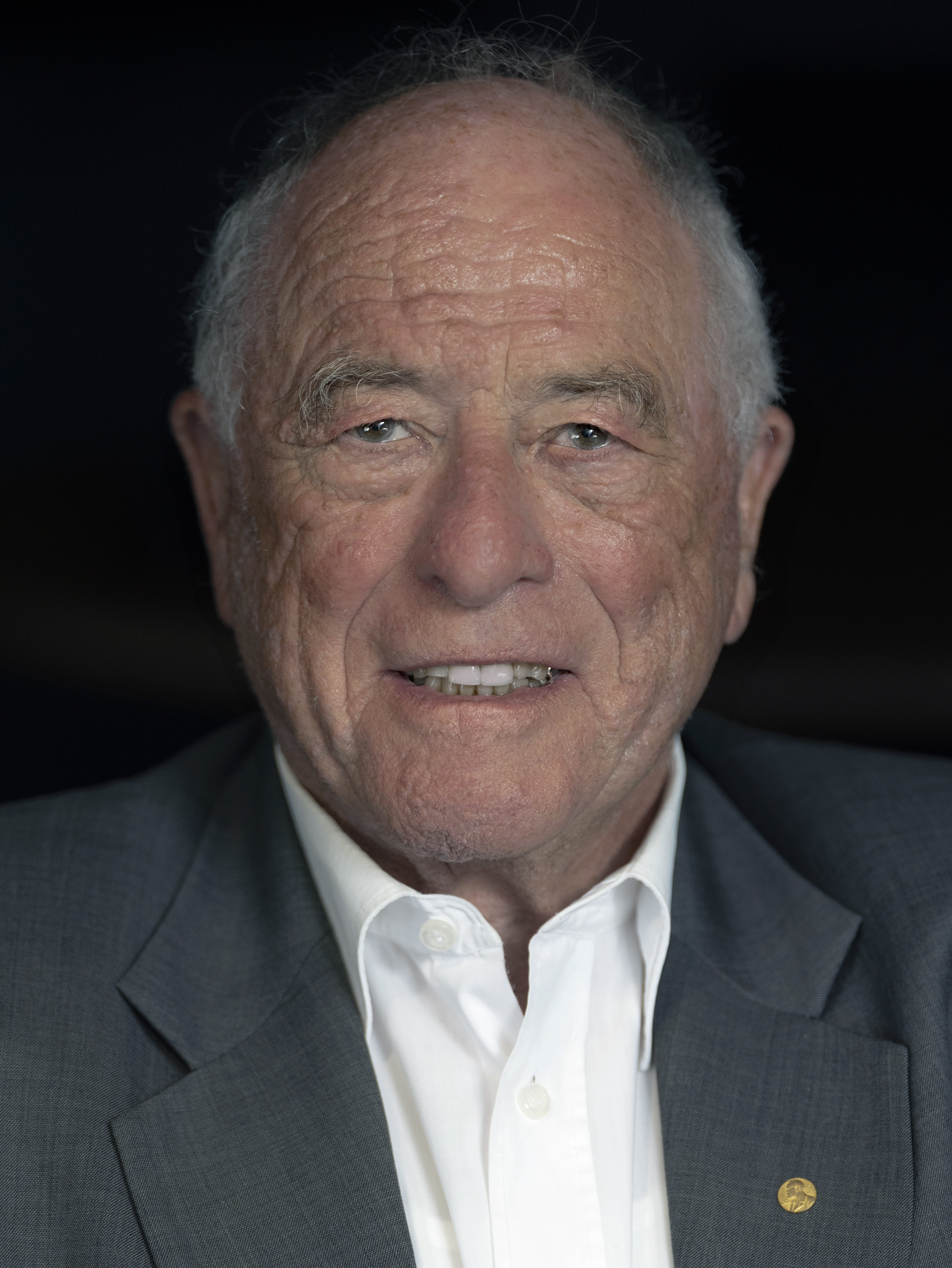
- Wüthrich in 2022
- Born: 4 October 1938 (age 87); Aarberg, Switzerland
- Education: Universität Bern; Universität Basel
- Known for: Protein NMR; Transverse relaxation-optimized spectroscopy ST2-PT
- Awards: Nobel Prize in Chemistry (2002); Louis-Jeantet Prize for Medicine (1993); Kyoto Prize (1998); Marcel Benoist Prize (1991); Louisa Gross Horwitz Prize (1991); ForMemRS (2010)
- Scientific career
- Fields: Chemistry; Nuclear magnetic resonance
- Workplaces: ETH Zürich; University of California, Berkeley; Scripps Institute; University of Edinburgh; ShanghaiTech University
- Doctoral advisor: Silvio Fallab
- Website: www.scripps.edu/wuthrich

Kurt Wüthrich (born 4 October 1938 in Aarberg, Canton of Bern) is a Swiss chemist/biophysicist and Nobel Chemistry laureate, known for developing nuclear magnetic resonance (NMR) methods for studying biological macromolecules.

== Early life and education ==
Born in Aarberg, Switzerland, Wüthrich was educated in chemistry, physics, and mathematics at the University of Bern before pursuing his PhD supervised by Silvio Fallab at the University of Basel, awarded in 1964.

== Career ==
After his PhD, Wüthrich continued postdoctoral research with Fallab for a short time before leaving to work at the University of California, Berkeley for two years from 1965 with Robert E. Connick. That was followed by a stint working with Robert G. Shulman at the Bell Telephone Laboratories in Murray Hill, New Jersey from 1967 to 1969.

Wüthrich returned to Switzerland, to Zürich, in 1969, where he began his career there at the ETH Zürich, rising to Professor of Biophysics by 1980. He currently maintains a laboratory at the ETH Zürich, at The Scripps Research Institute, in La Jolla, California and at the iHuman Institute of ShanghaiTech University. He has also been a visiting professor at the University of Edinburgh (1997–2000), the Chinese University of Hong Kong (where he was an Honorary Professor) and Yonsei University.

During his graduate studies Wüthrich started out working with electron paramagnetic resonance spectroscopy, and the subject of his PhD thesis was "the catalytic activity of copper compounds in autoxidation reactions". During his time as a postdoc in Berkeley he began working with the newly developed and related technique of nuclear magnetic resonance spectroscopy to study the hydration of metal complexes. When Wüthrich joined the Bell Labs, he was put in charge of one of the first superconducting NMR spectrometers, and started studying the structure and dynamics of proteins. He has pursued this line of research ever since.

After returning to Switzerland, Wüthrich collaborated with, among others, Nobel laureate Richard R. Ernst on developing the first two-dimensional NMR experiments, and established the nuclear Overhauser effect as a convenient way of measuring distances within proteins. This research later led to the complete assignment of resonances for among others the bovine pancreatic trypsin inhibitor and glucagon.

In October 2010, Wüthrich participated in the USA Science and Engineering Festival's Lunch with a Laureate program where middle and high school students will get to engage in an informal conversation with a Nobel Prize–winning scientist over a brown-bag lunch. Wüthrich is also a member on the USA Science and Engineering Festival's Advisory Board and a supporter of the Campaign for the Establishment of a United Nations Parliamentary Assembly, an organisation which campaigns for democratic reform in the United Nations.

Wüthrich is a member of the Executive Advisory Board of the World.Minds Foundation, where he contributes to international dialogue on science, research, and innovation policy.

== Awards and honors ==
He was awarded the Louisa Gross Horwitz Prize from Columbia University in 1991, the Louis-Jeantet Prize for Medicine in 1993, the Otto Warburg Medal in 1999 and half of the Nobel Prize in Chemistry in 2002 for "his development of nuclear magnetic resonance spectroscopy for determining the three-dimensional structure of biological macromolecules in solution". He received the Bijvoet Medal of the Bijvoet Center for Biomolecular Research of Utrecht University in 2008. He was elected a Foreign Member of the Royal Society (ForMemRS) in 2010. In 2017 he was awarded the Endel Lippmaa Memorial Medal by the Estonian Academy of Sciences. He was also awarded the 2018 Fray International Sustainability Award at SIPS 2018 by FLOGEN Star Outreach.

== Personal details ==
On 2 April 2018, Dr. Wüthrich established permanent residency in Shanghai, China, after obtaining a Chinese permanent residence card.

== Bibliography ==
- NMR in Biological Research: Peptides and Proteins, American Elsevier Pub. Co, 1976
- NMR of proteins and nucleic acids, Wiley, 1986
- NMR In Structural Biology: A Collection Of Papers By Kurt Wuthrich, World Scientific Publishing Co Pte Ltd, 1995
