= Lewis E. Kay =

Canadian biochemist (born 1961)

Lewis Kay
- Born: September 26, 1961 (age 64); Edmonton, Alberta, Canada
- Education: BSc; Ph.D
- Alma mater: University of Alberta; Yale University
- Spouse: Julie Forman-Kay
- Children: 2
- Scientific career
- Workplaces: The Hospital for Sick Children; University of Toronto

Lewis Edward Kay, CC FRS FRSC (born September 26, 1961) is a Canadian academic and biochemist known for his research in biochemistry and nuclear magnetic resonance spectroscopy for the studies of the structure and behaviour of proteins. He is a professor of molecular genetics, biochemistry and chemistry at the University of Toronto and Senior Scientist in Molecular Medicine at The Hospital for Sick Children.

== Biography ==
Kay received a BSc in biochemistry from the University of Alberta in 1983, a PhD in molecular biophysics from Yale University in 1988, and did post-doctoral studies at the National Institutes of Health under the supervision of Ad Bax. In 2020, he was honoured as an international member of the National Academy of Sciences.

== Personal life ==
Kay is married to biophysicist Julie Forman-Kay, who studies intrinsically disordered proteins.

== Awards and honours ==
- 1996 – Merck Frosst Award
- 1998 – Canada's "Top 40 under 40"
- 1999 – Steacie Prize for Natural Sciences
- 2002 – Founders Medal International Society of Magnetic Resonance in Biological Systems
- 2002 – Flavelle Medal, Royal Society of Canada
- 2004 – Günther Laukien Prize
- 2006 – Elected to the Royal Society of Canada
- 2008 – Premier's Discovery Award
- 2010 – Elected to the Royal Society
- 2012 – Khorana Prize, Royal Society of Chemistry
- 2017 – Inducted as an Officer of the Order of Canada
- 2017 – Gairdner Foundation International Award
- 2018 – Herzberg Medal of the Natural Sciences and Engineering Research Council of Canada
- 2019 – Doctor of Science honoris causa from The University of British Columbia
- 2019 – Nakanishi Prize
- 2026 – Companion of the Order of Canada.
- 2026 – Royal Medal of the Royal Society.
