= Gerhard Wagner (physicist) =

German-American physicist

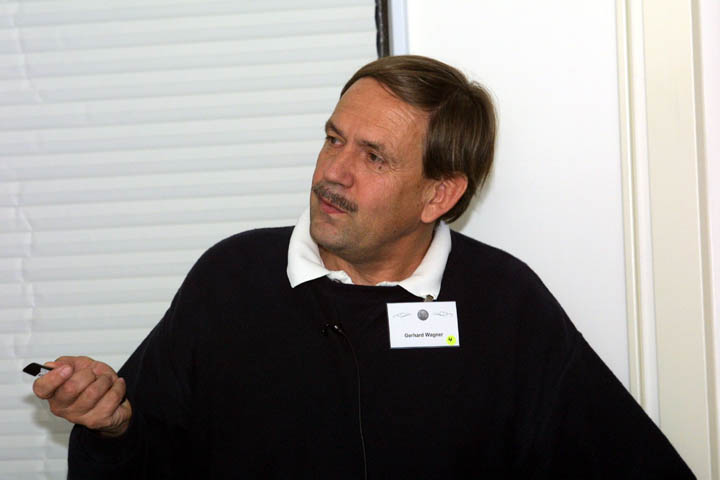
- Wagner in 2011 giving an NMR lecture
- Born: 1945 (age 80–81); Bor, Czechoslovakia
- Occupation: Physicist
- Known for: Biological NMR spectroscopy

Gerhard Wagner (born 1945) is a German-American physicist. Currently the Elkan Rogers Blout Professor of Biological Chemistry and Molecular Pharmacology at Harvard Medical School, he is an Elected Fellow of the American Association for the Advancement of Science, German National Academy of Sciences Leopoldina, American Academy of Arts and Sciences, National Academy of Sciences and International Society of Magnetic Resonance.

Wagner is considered one of the pioneers in Biological Nuclear Magnetic Resonance spectroscopy (Bio-NMR) and his research has been focused on protein structure, dynamics and stability, and on the relation of these to protein function. He is a structural biologist and is recognized for his work on the development of NMR spectroscopy for determination of protein structures in solution and characterizing protein dynamics.

== Education and early life ==
Wagner was born in 1945 in Bor (now in the Czech Republic). He was the first to receive a college education in his family. Born to a blue-collar family, after World War II in the German-speaking part of Czechoslovakia, his family was expelled and ended up in Southern Bavaria, where he grew up. Due to his school records he could go to a humanistic gymnasium, an institution that teaches classical antiquity specifically, and received an education with nine years of Latin and six years of classical Greek but also a good education in math and some physics. There, he had an excellent math/physics teacher and became fascinated with physics. Wagner was educated in a classical humanistic high school (humanistic Gymnasium in Germany).

== Career ==
Wagner studied Physics at the Technical University in Munich with work on Mossbauer spectroscopy of iron-containing proteins. He pursued his PhD in Biophysics at the ETH Zurich where he graduated in 1977 with studies of protein dynamics, measuring rates of aromatic ring flips and hydrogen exchange.

After graduation, he spent six months at the chemistry department of MIT to explore solid state NMR. After this he went to the laboratory of Kurt Wüthrich at the ETH in Zürich. There he continued to work on solution NMR of proteins. He learned about the nuclear Overhauser effect (nOe) and developed procedures assigning specific NMR resonances to individual amino acids in the sequence of proteins. He was the first to completely assign the resonances of an entire protein, basic pancreatic trypsin inhibitor. This became the foundation of solving protein structures in solution by NMR. The first structure he determined was for rabbit metallothioneine 2. When he and his team were ready to publish it, a crystal structure was reported for the same protein but was entirely different from his topology. After intensive scrutiny of his data it became clear that his structure was correct, and the crystal structure was not. This made the crystallographers aware of him, and he received offers for faculty positions at Duke, the University of Michigan, and the University of Minnesota.

He accepted the position at the University of Michigan in Ann Arbor, where he was hired as associate professor with tenure in 1987. Before his arrival in Michigan, he had ordered construction of a triple resonance probe for his new spectrometer. This allowed pulsing ^{1}H, ^{13}C, and ^{15}N. After the probe was delivered in 1988, he developed triple resonance methods for conformation-independent sequential assignments of proteins. This has become the basis for today’s resonance assignments of proteins and structure determination of proteins in solution up to 50 kDa and above.

In 1990, Wagner was recruited to Harvard Medical School as a Professor in the Department of Biological Chemistry and Molecular Pharmacology. He has remained at Harvard since, and in 1992 he was named the Elkan Rogers Blout Professor of Biological Chemistry and Molecular Pharmacology. In addition to his faculty duties, Wagner has served on the editorial boards of several journals (such as Journal of Magnetic Resonance and Journal of Biomolecular NMR) and organized numerous international conferences in the field of NMR and structural biology.

== Research Contributions ==
Wagner is regarded as a pioneer in biomolecular NMR spectroscopy and structural biology. Early in his career, his NMR studies revealed fundamental insights into protein dynamics and stability. For example, he performed the first comprehensive NMR analysis of hydrogen–deuterium exchange in a protein, demonstrating that deeply buried amide hydrogens only exchange upon global unfolding of the protein. He also discovered that aromatic ring side chains in proteins can flip rapidly even in otherwise rigid protein interiors, a surprising finding that provided early evidence of internal motions within folded proteins. These studies underscored the power of NMR for observing protein dynamics, at a time when X-ray crystallography provided only static structures.

Wagner has made numerous innovations in NMR methodology that enabled the determination of protein structures in solution. He played a key role in developing 2D and triple-resonance NMR techniques for structure determination, introducing methods to assign NMR signals to specific atoms in isotopically labeled proteins. Notably, his group was among the first to implement triple-resonance NMR experiments involving ^1H, ^13C, and ^15N nuclei, which greatly facilitated the analysis of larger proteins. Using these and other advances, Wagner and his collaborators have determined the three-dimensional structures of more than 60 proteins by NMR. These include important proteins involved in eukaryotic translation initiation (such as initiation factor eIF4E and its complexes), components of the T-cell receptor complex and signaling pathways, and the voltage-dependent anion channel (VDAC) of the mitochondrial outer membrane. His 2003 study of the eIF4E–eIF4G interaction provided a structural basis for how the ribosome is recruited to the mRNA 5′ cap during translation initiation.

In addition to structural studies, Wagner’s laboratory has pursued chemical biology and therapeutic applications. He has identified small-molecule inhibitors that target protein–protein interactions in the translation initiation machinery (for example, disrupting the eIF4E/eIF4G complex) and shown that these compounds can exhibit anti-tumor activity by selectively affecting protein synthesis in cancer cells. Wagner has also contributed to methodological innovations for challenging systems, such as developing improved NMR approaches for membrane proteins. In 2017 his team introduced “covalently circularized nanodiscs” – specialized nanoscale lipid bilayers stabilized by engineered scaffold proteins – to study membrane proteins and virus membrane fusion in a more native-like environment. Throughout his career, Wagner has continued to advance NMR techniques (including non-uniform sampling strategies and exploitation of the TROSY effect for low-γ nuclei) to extend the reach of NMR in structural biology.

== Award and honors ==
- 1970–1974 Fellowship Studienstiftung des Deutschen Volkes
- 1977 Zürich Protein Lecture, ETH Zürich
- 1995/96 Welcome Visiting Professor in Basic Medical Sciences, Kansas State University
- 1997 The Wellcome Lecture in Structural Biology, Kansas State University
- 1999 Elected Fellow to American Association for the Advancement of Science
- 2000 Fellow, American Association for the Advancement of Science (AAAS)
- 2003 The Cleveland Structural Biology Lecture
- 2004 Eastern Analytical Symposium Achievement Award in Magnetic Resonance
- 2005 Elected Member to German National Academy of Sciences Leopoldina
- 2008 Elected Fellow to the International Society of Magnetic Resonance
- 2011 Stein and Moore Award of the Protein Society
- 2011 Agilent Thought Leader Award for contributions to nuclear magnetic resonance research
- 2012 Mill Hill Lecture 2012
- 2013 Elected member of the National Academy of Sciences
- 2013 Harvard-Australia Fellowship
- 2015 Elected fellow of the American Academy of Arts and Sciences
- 2018 Gunther Laukien Prize for innovative experimental NMR research.

=== Memberships ===
- American Chemical Society
- American Society for the Advancement of Science
- American Society for Biochemistry and Molecular Biology
- Protein Society
- American Biophysical Society
