= Nmrpipe =

Data processing software for nuclear magnetic resonance

NMRPipe is a Nuclear Magnetic Resonance data processing program.

The project was preceded by other functionally similar programs but is, by and large, one of the most popular software packages for NMR Data Processing in part due to its efficiency (due to its utilization of Unix pipes) and ease of use (due to the large amount of logic embedded in its individual functions).

NMRPipe consists of a series of "functions" which can be applied to a FID data file in any sequence, by using UNIX pipes.

Each individual function in NMRPipe has a specific task and a set of arguments which can be sent to configure its behavior.

== See also ==
- Comparison of NMR software
