= Transverse relaxation-optimized spectroscopy =

Transverse relaxation optimized spectroscopy (TROSY) is an experiment in protein NMR spectroscopy that allows studies of large molecules or complexes.

The application of NMR to large molecules is normally limited by the fact that the line widths generally increase with molecular mass. Larger molecules have longer rotational correlation times and consequently shorter transverse relaxation times (T_{2}). In other words, the NMR signal from larger molecules decays more rapidly, leading to line broadening in the NMR spectrum and poor resolution.

In an HSQC spectrum in which decoupling has not been applied, peaks appear as multiplets due to J-coupling. Crucially the different multiplet components have different widths. This is due to constructive or destructive interaction between different relaxation mechanisms. Typically for large proteins at high magnetic field strengths, the transverse (T_{2}) relaxation is dominated by the dipole-dipole (DD) mechanism and the chemical shift anisotropy (CSA) mechanism. As the relaxation mechanisms are generally correlated but contribute to the overall relaxation rate of a given component with different signs, the multiplet components relax with very different overall rates. The TROSY experiment is designed to select the component for which the different relaxation mechanisms have almost cancelled, leading to a single, sharp peak in the spectrum. This significantly increases both spectral resolution and sensitivity, both of which are at a premium when studying large and complex biomolecules.

This approach significantly extends the molecular mass range that can be studied by NMR, but it generally requires high magnetic fields to achieve the necessary balance between the CSA and DD relaxation mechanisms; CSAs scale with field strength, while dipole-dipole couplings are field-independent.
