= G. Marius Clore =

Molecular biophysicist, structural biologist

G. Marius Clore MAE FRSC FMedSci FRS
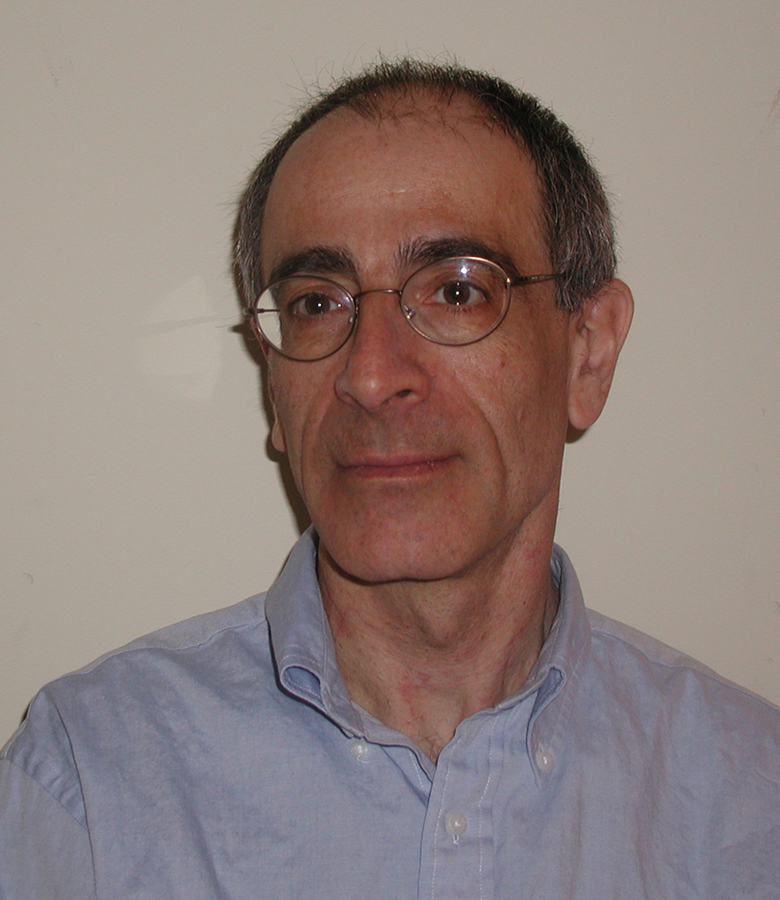
- Born: Gideon Marius Clore; London, U.K.
- Citizenship: British, American
- Education: University College London and University College Hospital Medical School, London, U.K.
- Known for: Laying the foundations for three-dimensional protein structure determination in solution by NMR, developing innovative approaches for extending NMR to larger and more complex systems, and using NMR to uncover invisible states of proteins
- Father: Leon Clore
- Awards: •Member of the National Academy of Sciences •Fellow of the Royal Society •Fellow of the American Academy of Arts and Sciences •Fellow of the U.K. Academy of Medical Sciences •Foreign Member of the Academia Europaea •Member of the American Academy of Science and Letters (https://academyscienceletters.org) •Royal Society of Chemistry Centenary Prize (2011) •Biochemical Society Centenary Award (2013) •Royal Society of Chemistry Khorana Prize (2021)
- Scientific career
- Fields: Molecular Biophysics, Nuclear Magnetic Resonance, Structural Biology, Chemistry
- Workplaces: MRC National Institute for Medical Research, London.; Max Planck Institute of Biochemistry, Martinsried, Germany.; National Institute of Diabetes and Digestive and Kidney Diseases, National Institutes of Health, Bethesda, Maryland, U.S.
- Doctoral advisor: Sir Arnold Burgen FRS
- Notable students: Robert T. Clubb; Hartmut Oschkinat; Julie Forman-Kay FRS
- Website: gmclore.org/clore

G. Marius Clore MAE, FRSC, FMedSci, FRS is a British and American molecular biophysicist and structural biologist. He was born in London, U.K. and is a dual U.S./U.K. Citizen. He is a Member of the National Academy of Sciences, a Fellow of the Royal Society, a Fellow of the Academy of Medical Sciences, a Fellow of the American Academy of Arts and Sciences, a NIH Distinguished Investigator, and the Chief of the Molecular and Structural Biophysics Section in the Laboratory of Chemical Physics of the National Institute of Diabetes and Digestive and Kidney Diseases at the U.S. National Institutes of Health. He is known for his foundational work in three-dimensional protein and nucleic acid structure determination by biomolecular NMR spectroscopy, for advancing experimental approaches to the study of large macromolecules and their complexes by NMR, and for developing NMR-based methods to study rare conformational states in protein-nucleic acid and protein-protein recognition. Clore's discovery of previously undetectable, functionally significant, rare transient states of macromolecules has yielded fundamental new insights into the mechanisms of important biological processes, and in particular the significance of weak interactions and the mechanisms whereby the opposing constraints of speed and specificity are optimized. Further, Clore's work opens up a new era of pharmacology and drug design as it is now possible to target structures and conformations that have been heretofore unseen.

== Biography ==
Clore received his undergraduate degree with first class honours in biochemistry from University College London in 1976 and medical degree from UCL Medical School in 1979. After completing house physician and house surgeon appointments at University College Hospital and St Charles' Hospital (part of the St. Mary's Hospital group), respectively, he was a member of the scientific staff of the Medical Research Council National Institute for Medical Research from 1980 to 1984. He received his PhD from the National Institute for Medical Research in Physical Biochemistry in 1982. He was awarded a joint Lister Institute Research Fellowship from the Lister Institute of Preventive Medicine which he held from 1982 to 1984 at the Medical Research Council. In 1984 he joined the Max Planck Institute for Biochemistry in Martinsried, Germany, where he headed the Biological NMR department from 1984 to 1988.

In 1988, Clore was recruited to the National Institutes of Health (NIH) Laboratory of Chemical Physics (National Institute of Diabetes and Digestive and Kidney Diseases) located in Bethesda, Maryland, U.S., where he interacted closely in the late 1980s and early 1990s with NIH colleagues Ad Bax, Angela Gronenborn and Dennis Torchia on the development of multidimensional heteronuclear NMR spectroscopy and a structural biology effort aimed at proteins involved in the pathogenesis of HIV/AIDS. He has remained at the NIH ever since and is currently a NIH Distinguished Investigator and Chief of the Section on Molecular and Structural Biophysics at the NIH. He is an elected Member of the United States National Academy of Sciences, a Fellow of the Royal Society, a Fellow of the Academy of Medical Sciences, a Fellow of the American Academy of Arts and Sciences, a Member of the American Academy of Science and Letters, and a Foreign Member of the Academia Europaea (Biochemistry and Molecular Biology Section). Clore's citation upon election to the Royal Society reads:

"Clore pioneered the development of NMR for determining three-dimensional structures of biological macromolecules and has consistently extended the frontiers of NMR to ever more complex systems. His work on the development of paramagnetic and other relaxation-based NMR experiments to detect and visualize transient, rare states of macromolecules, invisible to conventional structural and biophysical techniques, has shed unique insights into how macromolecules efficiently locate their binding partners, provided the first atomic view of the dynamic amyloid Aß assembly process from disordered peptides into protofibrils, and directly demonstrated that the apo state of the chaperonin GroEL possesses intrinsic foldase/unfoldase activities."

== Research ==
=== 3D structure determination in solution by NMR ===
Clore played a pivotal role in the development of three- and four-dimensional NMR spectroscopy, the use of residual dipolar couplings for structure determination, the development of simulated annealing and restrained molecular dynamics for three-dimensional protein and nucleic acid structure determination, the solution NMR structure determination of large protein complexes, the development of the combined use of NMR and small-angle X-ray scattering in solution structure determination, and the analysis and characterization of protein dynamics by NMR. Clore's work on complexes of all the cytoplasmic components of the bacterial phosphotransferase system (PTS) led to significant insights into how signal transduction proteins recognize multiple, structurally dissimilar partners by generating similar binding surfaces from completely different structural elements and exploiting side chain conformational plasticity. Clore is also one of the main authors of the very widely used XPLOR-NIH NMR structure determination program

=== Detection and visualization of excited and sparsely populated states ===
Clore's recent work has focused on developing new NMR methods (such as paramagnetic relaxation enhancement, dark state exchange saturation transfer spectroscopy and lifetime line broadening) to detect, characterize and visualize the structure and dynamics of sparsely populated states of macromolecules, which are important in macromolecular interactions but invisible to conventional structural and biophysical techniques. Examples of include the direct demonstration of rotation-coupled sliding and intermolecular translocation as mechanisms whereby sequence-specific DNA binding proteins locate their target site(s) within an overwhelming sea of non-specific DNA sequences; the detection, visualization and characterization of encounter complexes in protein-protein association; the analysis of the synergistic effects of conformational selection and induced fit in protein-ligand interactions; and the uncovering of "dark", spectroscopically invisible states in interactions of NMR-visible proteins and polypeptides (including intrinsically disordered states) with very large megadalton macromolecular assemblies. The latter includes an atomic-resolution view of the dynamics of the amyloid-β aggregation process. and the demonstration of intrinsic unfoldase/foldase activity of the macromolecular machine GroEL. These various techniques have also been used to uncover the kinetic pathway of pre-nucleation transient oligomerization events and associated structures involving the protein encoded by huntingtin exon-1, which may provide a potential avenue for therapeutic intervention in Huntington's disease, a fatal autosomal dominant, neurodegenerative condition.

=== Scientific impact ===
Clore is one of the most highly cited scientists in the fields of molecular biophysics, structural biology, biomolecular NMR and chemistry with over 560 published scientific articles and an h-index (number of papers cited h or more time) of 145. Clore is also one of only five NIH scientists to have been elected to both the United States National Academy of Sciences and The Royal Society, the other four being Julius Axelrod, Francis Collins, Harold Varmus and Ad Bax.

== Personal life ==
Marius Clore was educated at the Lycee Francais Charles de Gaulle in Kensington, London, University College London and UCL Medical School. He holds a 3rd degree black belt in Tae Kwon Do and was an avid cave diver. Marius Clore's father was the film producer Leon Clore whose credits include The French Lieutenant's Woman.

== Awards and honors ==
- 2026: Barry Prize of the American Academy of Science and Letters
- 2026: Stein & Moore Award of the Protein Society
- 2024: Elected Fellow of the American Physical Society
- 2024: Elected Fellow of the UK Academy of Medical Sciences
- 2021: Murray Goodman Memorial Prize
- 2021: Honorary Doctorate of Science (DSc) from University College London
- 2021: Royal Society of Chemistry Khorana Prize
- 2020: Elected Fellow of the Royal Society
- 2020: Biophysical Society Innovation Award
- 2015: Elected Foreign Member of the Academia Europaea.
- 2014: Elected Member of the United States National Academy of Sciences (Biophysics and Computational Biology section)
- 2012: Biochemical Society 2013 Centenary Award (previously known as the Jubilee Medal) and Sir Frederick Gowland Hopkins Memorial Lecture (U.K.)
- 2011: Royal Society of Chemistry Centenary Prize
- 2011: Elected Fellow of the International Society of Magnetic Resonance
- 2011: Elected NIH Distinguished Investigator
- 2010: Elected Fellow of the American Academy of Arts and Sciences
- 2010: Elected Fellow of the Biophysical Society
- 2010: Hillebrand Award of the Washington Chemical Society
- 2003: Elected Member of the Lister Institute of Preventive Medicine (U.K.)
- 2001: Original member, Institute for Scientific Information (ISI) Highly Cited Researchers Database (in Biology & Biochemistry and Chemistry sections).
- 1999: Elected Fellow of the American Association for the Advancement of Science.
- 1993: Dupont-Merck Young Investigator Award of the Protein Society
- 1990: Elected Fellow of the Royal Society of Chemistry (FRSC) (U.K).
