= XPLOR-NIH =

Xplor-NIH is a highly sophisticated and flexible biomolecular structure determination program which includes an interface to the legacy X-PLOR program. The main developers are Charles Schwieters and Marius Clore of the National Institutes of Health. Xplor-NIH is based on a C++ framework with an extensive Python interface enabling very powerful and easy scripting of complex structure determination and refinement protocols. Restraints derived from all current solution and many solid state nuclear magnetic resonance (NMR) and X-ray scattering experiments can be accommodated during structure calculations. Extensive facilities are also available for many types of ensemble calculations where the experimental data cannot be accounted for by a unique structure. Many of the structure calculation protocols involve the use of simulated annealing designed to overcome local minima on the path of the global minimum region of the target function. These calculations can be carried out using any combination of Cartesian, torsion angle and rigid body dynamics and minimization. Currently Xplor-NIH is the most versatile, comprehensive and widely used structure determination/refinement package in NMR structure determination.
