= Günther Laukien Prize =

- Description: Recognizing cutting-edge experimental NMR research
- Presented by: Experimental Nuclear Magnetic Resonance Conference (ENC)
- Reward: $20,000
- Website: www.enc-conference.org/Laukien-Prize

The Günther Laukien Prize is a prize presented at the Experimental Nuclear Magnetic Resonance Conference "to recognize recent cutting-edge experimental NMR research with a high probability of enabling beneficial new applications". The prize was established in 1999 in memoriam to Günther Laukien, who was a pioneer in NMR research. The prize money of $20,000 is financed by Bruker, the company founded by Laukien.

== Winners ==
The recipients of the Günther Laukien Prize have been:

- 2026: Ago Samoson and Guido Pintacuda
- 2025: Zhehong Gan
- 2024: Hashim Al-Hashimi
- 2023 Lyndon Emsley and Anne Lesage
- 2022 Michael Garwood
- 2021 Gareth Morris
- 2020 Simon Duckett, Konstantin Ivanov, and Warren S. Warren
- 2019 Geoffrey Bodenhausen, and Christian Griesinger
- 2018 Gerhard Wagner
- 2017 Kurt Zilm and Bernd Reif
- 2016 Robert S. Balaban and Peter van Zijl
- 2015 Arthur Palmer III
- 2014 Marc Baldus, Mei Hong, Ann McDermott, Beat H. Meier, Hartmut Oschkinat, and Robert Tycko
- 2013 Clare Grey
- 2012 Klaes Golman and Jan Henrik Ardenkjaer-Larsen
- 2011 Daniel Rugar, John Mamin, and John Sidles
- 2010 Paul Callaghan
- 2009 Daniel Weitekamp
- 2008 Malcolm Levitt
- 2007 Robert G. Griffin
- 2006 Thomas Szyperski, Eriks Kupce, Ray Freeman, and Rafael Bruschweiler
- 2005 Stephan Grzesiek
- 2004 Lewis E. Kay
- 2003 Jacob Schaefer
- 2002 Ad Bax, Aksel Bothner-By and James Prestegard
- 2001 Peter Boesiger, Klaas Prüßmann and Markus Weiger
- 2000 Lucio Frydman
- 1999 Konstantin Pervushin, Roland Riek, Gerhard Wider, and Kurt Wuthrich

== See also ==
- List of physics awards
