= Russell Varian Prize =

The Russell Varian Prize was an international scientific prize awarded for a single, high-impact and innovative contribution in the field of nuclear magnetic resonance (NMR), that laid the foundation for the development of new technologies in the field. It honored the memory of Russell Varian, the pioneer behind the creation of the first commercial NMR spectrometer and the co-founder, in 1948, of Varian Associates, one of the first high-tech companies in Silicon Valley. The prize carried a monetary award of €15,000 and it was awarded annually between the years 2002 and 2015 (except for 2003) by a committee of experts in the field. The award ceremony alternated between the European Magnetic Resonance (EUROMAR) Conference and the International Council on Magnetic Resonance in Biological Systems (ICMRBS) Conference. Originally, the prize was sponsored by Varian, Inc. and later by Agilent Technologies, after the latter acquired Varian, Inc. in 2010. The prize was discontinued in 2016 after Agilent Technologies closed its NMR division.

== Russell Varian Prize Awardees ==
- 2002 Jean Jeener. Contribution: Multi-dimensional Fourier NMR spectroscopy. Jeener, J. (September 1971). Lecture. Ampère International Summer School II. Basko Polje, Yugoslavia.
- 2004 Erwin L. Hahn. Contribution: Spin echo phenomena and experiments.
- 2005 Nicolaas Bloembergen. Contribution: Nuclear magnetic relaxation.
- 2006 John S. Waugh. Contribution: Average Hamiltonian theory.
- 2007 Alfred G. Redfield. Contribution: Relaxation Theory.
- 2008 Alexander Pines. Contribution: Cross-polarization method for NMR in solids.
- 2009 Albert W. Overhauser. Contribution: Nuclear Overhauser effect (NOE).
- 2010 Martin Karplus. Contribution: Karplus equation.
- 2011 Gareth A. Morris. Contribution: INEPT pulse sequence.
- 2012 Ray Freeman and Weston A. Anderson. Contribution: Double resonance.
- 2013 Lucio Frydman. Contribution: Ultrafast NMR.
- 2014 Ad Bax. Contribution: Homonuclear broad band decoupled absorption spectra.
- 2015 Malcolm Levitt. Contribution: Composite pulses.

== See also ==
- List of physics awards
