= Insensitive nuclei enhanced by polarization transfer =

Signal enhancement method

Insensitive nuclei enhancement by polarization transfer, abbreviated as INEPT, is a signal enhancement method used in NMR spectroscopy. It involves the transfer of nuclear spin polarization from spins with large Boltzmann population differences to nuclear spins of interest with lower Boltzmann population differences. INEPT uses J-coupling for the polarization transfer in contrast to Nuclear Overhauser effect (NOE), which arises from dipolar cross-relaxation. This method of signal enhancement was introduced by Gareth A. Morris and Ray Freeman in 1979. Due to its usefulness in signal enhancement, pulse sequences used in heteronuclear NMR experiments often contain blocks of INEPT or INEPT-like sequences.

== Background ==
The sensitivity of NMR signal detection depends on the gyromagnetic ratio (γ) of the nucleus. In general, the signal intensity produced from a nucleus with a gyromagnetic ratio of γ is proportional to γ^{3} because the magnetic moment, the Boltzmann populations, and the nuclear precession frequency all increase in proportion to the gyromagnetic ratio γ. For example, the gyromagnetic ratio of ^{13}C is 4 times lower than that of ^{1}H, so the signal intensity it produces will be 64 times lower than one produced by a proton. However, since noise also increases as the square root of the frequency, the sensitivity is roughly proportional to γ^{5/2}. A ^{13}C nucleus would be 32 times less sensitive than a proton, and ^{15}N around 300 times less sensitive. Sensitivity enhancement techniques are therefore desirable when recording an NMR signal from an insensitive nucleus.

The sensitivity can be enhanced artificially by increasing the Boltzmann factors. One method may be through NOE; for example, for ^{13}C signal, the signal-to-noise ratio can be improved three-fold when the attached protons are saturated. However, for NOE, a negative value of K, the ratio of gyromagnetic ratios of the nuclei, may result in a reduction in signal intensity. Since^{15}N has a negative gyromagnetic ratio, the observed ^{15}N signal can be near zero if the dipolar relaxation has to compete with other mechanisms. Alternative methods are therefore necessary for nuclei with a negative gyromagnetic ratio. One such method using the INEPT pulse sequence was proposed by Ray Freeman in 1979, which became widely adopted.

== Signal enhancement via the INEPT technique ==
The INEPT signal enhancement has two sources:

- The spin population effect increases the signal by a factor of K = ratio of gyromagnetic ratios γ_{I}/γ_{S} of the nuclei, where γ_{I} and γ_{S} are the gyromagnetic ratio of the proton (the I spins) and the low-sensitivity nuclei (the S spins) respectively.
- Nuclei with higher magnetogyric ratio generally relax more quickly. Since the rate at which the INEPT transfer can be repeated is limited by the relaxation of these spins (rather than the low sensitivity spins), the INEPT experiment can be repeated more frequently, increasing the signal-to-noise ratio.

As a result, INEPT can enhance the NMR signal by a factor larger than K, while the maximum enhancement via NOE is by a factor of 1+K/2. Unlike with NOE, no penalty is incurred by a negative gyromagnetic ratio in INEPT. It is therefore a useful method for enhancing the signal from nuclei with negative gyromagnetic ratio such as ^{15}N or ^{29}Si. The ^{15}N signal may be enhanced by a factor of 10 via INEPT.

== Pulse sequence ==
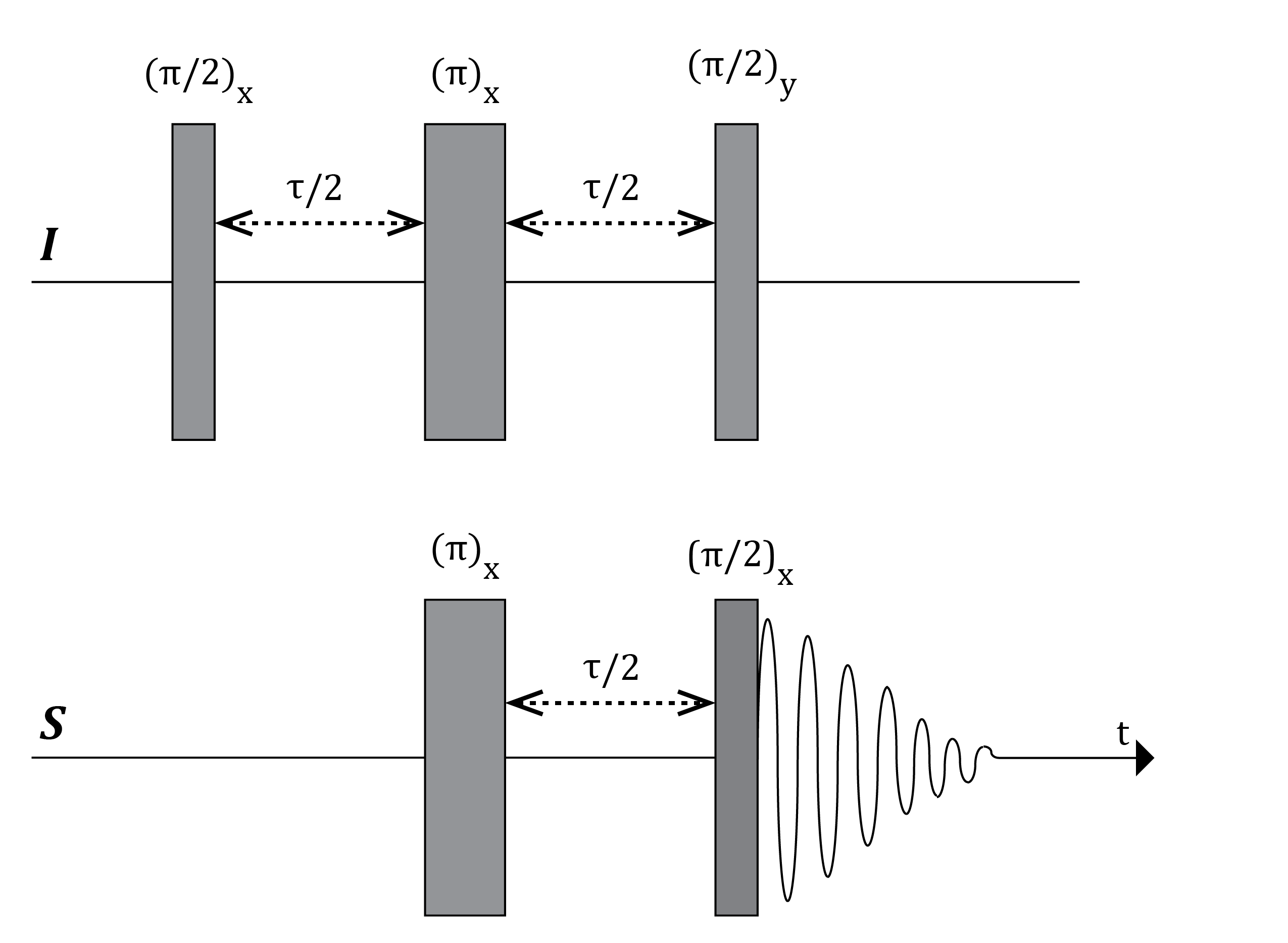
Diagrammatic representation of the INEPT NMR pulse sequence. The thin bar denotes a 90° pulse, while the thick bar denotes a 180° pulse. INEPT is utilized often to improve ^{^{15}}N resolution because it can accommodate negative gyromagnetic ratios, increases Boltzmann population, and decreases T_{1} relaxation.

The pulse sequence of INEPT, as represented in the diagram, can be read as a combination of a spin echo and selective population inversion (SPI). The spin echo is a 90° pulse followed by a 180° pulse after a time period τ and is applied on the proton, the sensitive nucleus (designated, perhaps counter-intuitively, as the I spin, while the insensitive nucleus is the S spin; note, however, that the original paper on INEPT used the opposite designations).

Spin Echo

90°_{I}(X) — τ — 180°_{I}(X)

The first 90° pulse flips the proton magnetization onto the +y axis of the rotating frame and, due to inhomogeneity of the static magnetic field, the isochromats fan out at slightly different frequencies. After a time period, a 180° pulse is applied along the x axis, rotating the isochromats towards the -y axis. As each individual isochromat still precesses at the same frequency as before, all the isochromats converge and become refocused, thereby regenerating the signal, i.e. the echo. The chemical shifts are also refocused at the same time as the field inhomogeneity, and this property allows the magnetization to be manipulated independent of the chemical shifts. The refocusing allows all the proton chemical shifts to undergo population inversion in the SPI step without its undesirable selectivity.

Selective Population Inversion

180°_{S} — τ — 90°_{I}(Y), 90°_{S} — Acquisition

As shown in the diagram, a 180° pulse is applied on the insensitive nucleus simultaneously with the 180° pulse on the proton. This is the population inversion part of the scheme, where a further 90° pulse after a time period on both the sensitive and insensitive nuclei rotate the magnetization onto the z-axis. This has the effect of producing an antiphase alignment of magnetization on the z axis, an important step during which the polarization is transferred from the sensitive nucleus to the insensitive one.

== Variations ==
There are a number of variations of the experiments, for example, a symmetric refocusing step or an extra 90° ^{1}H pulse may be added, and there are also reverse INEPT pulse sequences.
