= Mei Hong (chemist) =

Chinese-American chemist

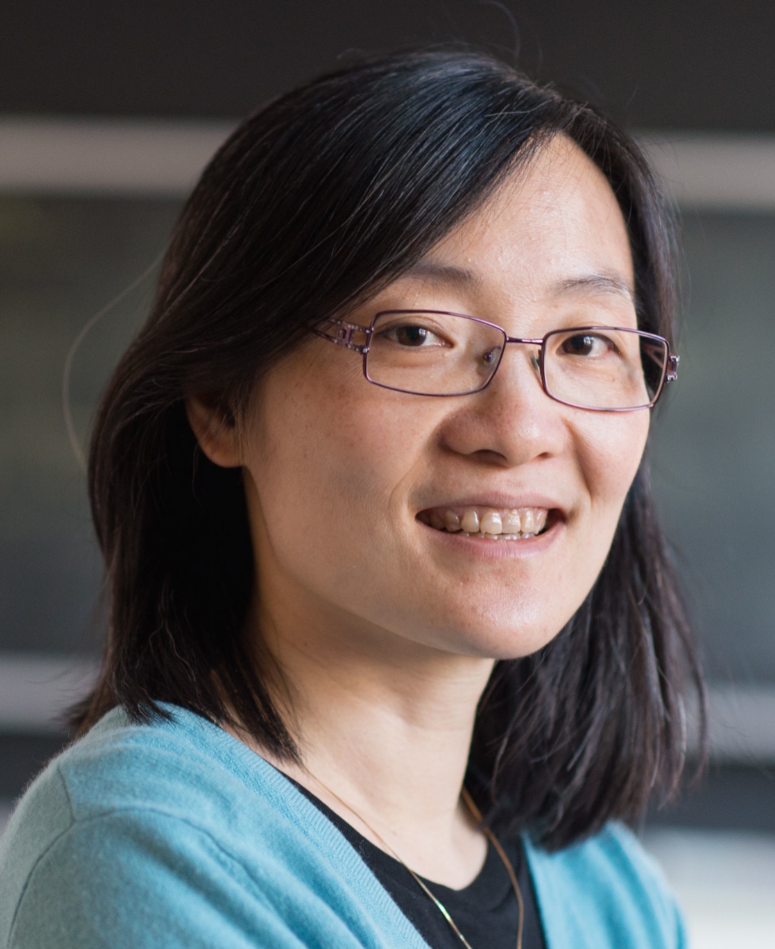
- Born: 1970 (age 55–56); China
- Education: Mount Holyoke College, University of California, Berkeley (PhD 1996)
- Known for: Development of solid-state nuclear magnetic resonance
- Awards: Nakanishi Prize (American Chemical Society), Günther Laukien Prize, ACS Award in Pure Chemistry, Beckman Young Investigator Award
- Scientific career
- Fields: Biophysical chemistry
- Workplaces: Massachusetts Institute of Technology, University of Massachusetts Amherst, Iowa State University
- Doctoral advisor: Alexander Pines
- Other academic advisors: Robert G. Griffin

Mei Hong (born 1970) is a Chinese-American biophysical chemist and professor of chemistry at the Massachusetts Institute of Technology. She is known for her creative development and application of solid-state nuclear magnetic resonance (ssNMR) spectroscopy to elucidate the structures and mechanisms of membrane proteins, plant cell walls, and amyloid proteins. She has received a number of recognitions for her work, including the American Chemical Society Nakanishi Prize in 2021, Günther Laukien Prize in 2014, the Protein Society Young Investigator award in 2012, and the American Chemical Society’s Pure Chemistry award in 2003.

== Education and career ==
Hong grew up in China and completed her B.A. degree in chemistry from Mount Holyoke College (summa cum laude) in 1992 and a Ph.D. degree from the University of California, Berkeley in 1996. There she worked in the laboratory of Alexander Pines to investigate phospholipid structure and dynamics using variable-angle-spinning NMR. After a one-year postdoctoral stint in the laboratory of Robert G. Griffin at the Massachusetts Institute of Technology, she went to University of Massachusetts Amherst and developed biosynthetic isotopic labeling approaches to advance protein structure determination by ssNMR. She started an assistant professorship at Iowa State University in 1999, became an associate professor in 2002 and full professor in 2004, and held the first John D. Corbett Professorship from 2007 to 2010. In 2014, she returned to the Massachusetts Institute of Technology as a professor of chemistry.

== Research ==
Hong's research focuses on elucidating the structure, dynamics and mechanism of membrane proteins using ssNMR. She is particularly known for her in-depth study of the Matrix-2 (M2) proteins of influenza A viruses, which are responsible for all flu pandemics in history. M2 is an acid-activated proton channel and a membrane scission protein of the influenza virus. Hong's ssNMR studies have provided insights into the proton-conduction mechanism of this channel, by quantifying the proton transfer rates and equilibria between water and the proton-selective histidine residue. She showed that the antiviral drug amantadine inhibits proton conduction by direct occlusion of the channel pore. She determined the cholesterol-binding structure of the M2 protein, which sheds light on how cholesterol mediates M2's membrane scission function. In 2020 she determined both the influenza B M2 protein structure and the SARS-CoV-2 envelope protein structure, the latter in rapid response to COVID-19. The 1.5 Å BM2 structures in the closed and open states revealed different activation mechanisms of BM2 compared to influenza AM2. The 2.1 Å SARS-CoV-2 envelope protein structure forms the basis for antiviral drug design.

Other membrane proteins that Hong's group has studied include β-hairpin antimicrobial peptides, channel-forming colicins, and viral fusion proteins. She determined the structure of the membrane toroidal pores formed by the antimicrobial peptide protegrin-1, which explained the membrane-disruptive mechanism of this peptide. She showed that the transmembrane domain of viral fusion proteins can be conformationally plastic, and the β-sheet conformation can correlate with the generation of membrane curvature and membrane dehydration, which are necessary for virus-cell fusion.

Hong has also investigated the structure and dynamics of amyloid proteins, including full-length tau and Aβ peptides involved in neurodegenerative diseases as well as amyloid fibrils formed by designed peptides. She showed that the peptide hormone glucagon fibrillizes into an antiparallel hydrogen-bonded β-sheet with two coexisting molecular conformations. These studies shed light on the origin of structural polymorphism, water interaction, and metal ion binding.

Hong pioneered the study of plant cell walls using multidimensional ssNMR. These studies revealed the molecular interactions of the polysaccharides in plant cell walls, and helped to revise the conventional model of the primary cell wall structure by proposing a single-network model where cellulose, hemicellulose and pectins all interact with each other. She determined the binding target of the protein expansin to be hemicellulose-enriched regions of cellulose microfibrils, thus giving insight into the mechanism of wall loosening by expansin.

To address these questions, Hong has developed isotopic labeling strategies, multidimensional NMR correlation experiments, polarization transfer techniques, and computational methods for resonance assignment of NMR spectra.

== Selected awards and honors ==
- 2023 Christian B. Anfinsen Award
- 2021 American Chemical Society Nakanishi Prize
- 2018 Nirit and Michael Shaoul Fellow, Sackler Institute of Advanced Studies, Tel Aviv University
- 2016 Fellow of the International Society of Magnetic Resonance (ISMAR)
- 2014 Günther Laukien Prize, Experimental NMR Conference
- 2012 Protein Society Irving Sigal Young Investigator Award
- 2010 Founders Medal, International Council on Magnetic Resonance in Biological Systems
- 2010 Fellow of the American Association for the Advancement of Science
- 2003 Pure Chemistry Award, American Chemical Society
- 2002 Alfred P. Sloan Research Fellow, Sloan Foundation
- 2001 CAREER Award, National Science Foundation
- 1999 Beckman Young Investigator Award, Beckman Foundation
