= Lucio Frydman =

Israeli researcher

- לוסיו פרידמן
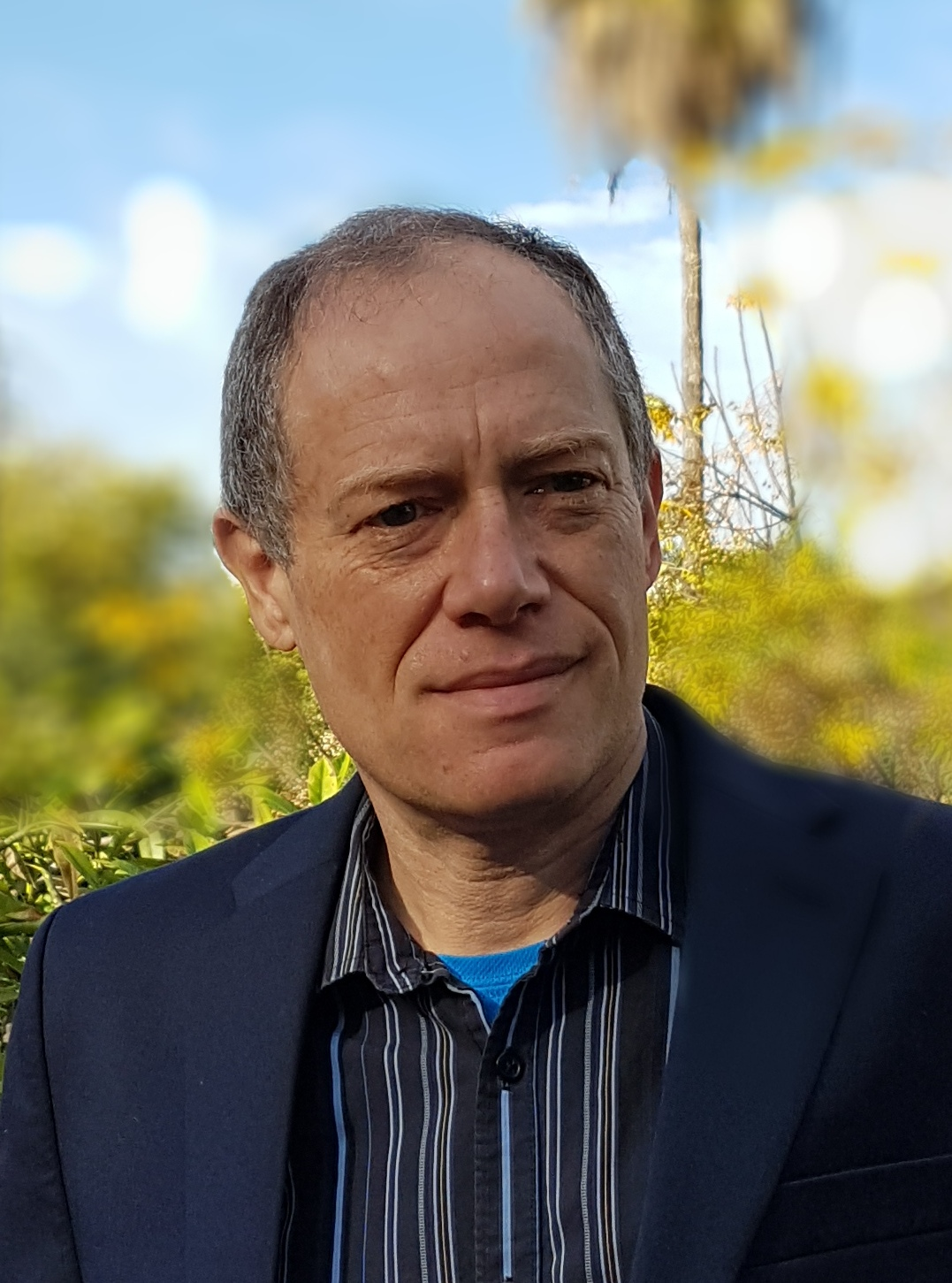
- Lucio Frydman in 2017
- Born: May 29, 1965 (age 61); Buenos Aires, Argentina
- Education: University of Buenos Aires
- Known for: Magnetic resonance methods development such as MQMAS and SPEN
- Awards: Herbert P. Broida Award American Physical Society (2025); Ernst Prize (2021); EAS Award for Outstanding Achievements in Magnetic Resonance (2019); Kolthoff Prize (2018); Russel Varian Prize (2013); ICS Prize for the Outstanding Young Scientist (2004); Günther Laukien Prize (2000); Sloan Research Fellowship(1997); Beckman Young Investigators Award (1996); Camille Dreyfus Teacher-Scholar Award (1996)
- Scientific career
- Fields: MRI, NMR, SSNMR
- Workplaces: Weizmann Institute of Science, National High Magnetic Field Laboratory

Lucio Frydman (Hebrew: לוסיו פרידמן; born 1965) is an Argentine-Israeli chemist whose research focuses on magnetic resonance imaging (MRI), nuclear magnetic resonance (NMR) and solid-state NMR. He was awarded the 2000 Günther Laukien Prize, the 2013 Russell Varian Prize, the 2021 Ernst Prize, and the 2025 Herbert P. Broida Award of the American Physical Society He is Professor in the Department of Chemical and Biological Physics at the Weizmann Institute of Science in Israel and Chief Scientist in Chemistry and Biology at the US National High Magnetic Field Laboratory in Tallahassee, Florida. He is a fellow of the International Society of Magnetic Resonance and of the International Society of Magnetic Resonance in Medicine. He was the Editor-in-Chief of the Journal of Magnetic Resonance (2011-2021).

== Birth and Education ==
Frydman was born and raised in Buenos Aires, Argentina, where he completed his undergraduate studies in chemistry in 1986 at the University of Buenos Aires. In 1990 he received his Ph.D. in chemistry from the same university.

== Career ==
In 1990 Frydman started working in his post-doctoral research at the Lawrence Berkeley National Laboratory and at the University of California, Berkeley, under the direction of Alexander Pines. In 1992 he was appointed Assistant Professor in the Department of Chemistry at the University of Illinois at Chicago, where he became Associate Professor in 1996, and Full Professor in 1999. In 2001 Frydman moved to Israel, where he was appointed Professor in the Department of Chemical Physics at the Weizmann Institute of Science. Since 2015 he holds the Bertha and Isadore Gudelsky Professorial Chair; in 2017 Frydman was appointed Head of the newly formed Department of Chemical and Biological Physics. He was Director of the Fritz Haber Center for Physical Chemistry from 2007 to 2012, and again since 2017. He is Director of the Helen and Martin Kimmel Institute for Magnetic Resonance Research since 2012 and he became the Director of the Clore Institute for High-Field Magnetic Resonance Imaging and Spectroscopy since 2015. In 2012 Frydman was appointed Chief Scientist in Chemistry and Biology at the US National High Magnetic Field Laboratory in Tallahassee, Florida.

== Research ==
Frydman’s research focuses on the fields of MRI, NMR and solid-state NMR. His scientific work has produced over 200 scientific publications in peer-reviewed journals. In 1995 Frydman and his coworker John Harwood developed the Multiple-Quantum Magic-Angle-Spinning (MQMAS) NMR experiment. The article describing this experiment received more than 1000 citations and the experiment became widely used for acquiring solid-state NMR spectra of quadrupolar nuclei. In 2002 Frydman and his coworkers introduced a new approach to collect NMR data that allows the acquisition of arbitrary multi-dimensional NMR spectra within a single scan. Provided that sufficient sensitivity is available, this method can yield 2D NMR correlations that are orders of magnitude faster than hitherto possible and it has found applications in many areas of chemistry. Recently, Frydman and his coworkers further developed this spatio-temporal encoding (SPEN) strategy to collect MRI images in a single scan. This method allows the acquisition of real-time MRI spectra and can be used to monitor processes in functional MRI (fMRI) and in diffusion MRI.

== Awards and honors ==
- 1992 Camille and Henry Dreyfus New Faculty Award
- 1995 National Science Foundation CAREER Award
- 1996 Camille Dreyfus Teacher-Scholar Award
- 1996 Beckman Young Investigators Award
- 1996 University of Illinois Scholar
- 1997 Sloan Research Fellowship
- 1998 National Science Foundation Creativity Extension Award
- 2000 Günther Laukien Prize
- 2004 Weizmann Institute Scientific Council Prize for Chemistry
- 2004 Israel Chemical Society Prize for the Outstanding Young Scientist
- 2006 Arthur D. Little Lecture in Physical Chemistry, MIT
- 2006 Vaughan Lecture, 48th Rocky Mountain Conference on Analytical Chemistry, Breckenridge, Colorado
- 2008 Fellow of the International Society of Magnetic Resonance
- 2009 Helen and Martin Kimmel Award for Innovative Investigation
- 2010 Honorary Member, National Magnetic Resonance Society of India
- 2009 European Research Council Advanced Grant
- 2013 Russell Varian Prize
- 2013 Sir Paul Callaghan Lecture, 18th International Society of Magnetic Resonance Conference, Rio de Janeiro, Brazil
- 2014 Tianjuan Wang Lecture, Wuhan Institute of Physics and Mathematics, Chinese Academy of Sciences
- 2018 Kolthoff Prize, Technion
- 2019 EAS Award for Outstanding Achievements in Magnetic Resonance
- 2021 Ernst Prize
- 2022 Fellow of the International Society of Magnetic Resonance in Medicine (ISMRM)
- 2024 Fellow of the American Association for the Advancement of Science (AAAS)
- 2025 Herbert P. Broida Award, American Physical Society
