= Alexander Pines =

Israeli-born American chemist (1945–2024)

- אלכסנדר פינס
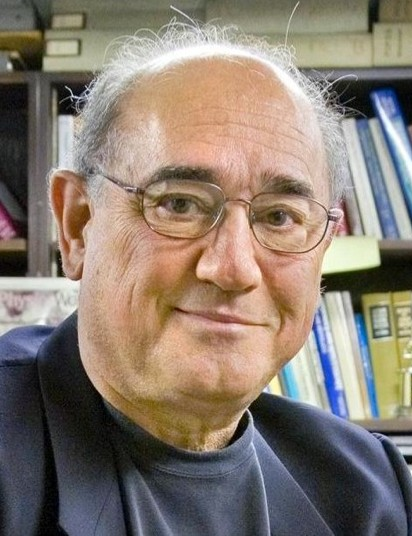
- Pines in 2007
- Born: June 22, 1945; Tel Aviv, Mandatory Palestine
- Died: November 1, 2024 (aged 79)
- Education: MIT
- Known for: Cross-polarization; NMR spectroscopy
- Awards: Russell Varian Prize (2008); Faraday Lectureship (2004); Glenn T. Seaborg Medal (2003); ForMemRS (2002); Dickson Prize (2001); Irving Langmuir Award (1998); Centenary Prize (1993); Wolf Prize in Chemistry (1991); Guggenheim Fellowship (1988); Bourke Award (1988); Camille Dreyfus Teacher-Scholar Awards (1976)
- Scientific career
- Fields: Chemistry
- Workplaces: UC Berkeley; Lawrence Berkeley Laboratory
- Thesis: High resolution NMR in solids (1972)
- Doctoral advisor: John S. Waugh
- Doctoral students: Robert Tycko; Mei Hong; Warren S. Warren

Alexander Pines (Hebrew: אלכסנדר פינס; June 22, 1945 – November 1, 2024) was an American chemist. He was the Glenn T. Seaborg Professor Emeritus, University of California, Berkeley, Chancellor's Professor Emeritus and Professor of the Graduate School, University of California, Berkeley, and a member of the California Institute for Quantitative Biosciences (QB3) and the Department of Bioengineering.

== Background ==
Pines was born on June 22, 1945, and grew up in Bulawayo in Southern Rhodesia (now Zimbabwe). He studied undergraduate mathematics and chemistry in Israel at Hebrew University of Jerusalem. Coming to the United States in 1968, Pines obtained his Ph.D. in chemical physics at M.I.T. in 1972 and joined the UC Berkeley faculty later that year.

Pines died on November 1, 2024, at the age of 79.

== Research ==
Pines was a pioneer in the development and applications of nuclear magnetic resonance (NMR) spectroscopy of non-liquid samples. In his early work, he demonstrated time-reversal of dipole-dipole couplings in many-body spin systems, and introduced high sensitivity, cross polarization NMR of dilute spins such as carbon-13 in solids (Proton Enhanced Nuclear Induction Spectroscopy), thereby helping to launch the era of modern solid-state NMR in chemistry. He also developed the areas of multiple-quantum spectroscopy, adiabatic sech/tanh inversion pulses, zero-field NMR, double rotation and dynamic-angle spinning, iterative maps for pulse sequences and quantum control, and the quantum geometric phase. His combination of optical pumping and cross-polarization made it possible to observe enhanced NMR of surfaces and the selective "lighting up" of solution NMR and magnetic resonance imaging (MRI) by means of laser-polarized xenon.

Until he retired to emeritus status, his program was composed of two complementary components. The first is the establishment of new concepts and techniques in NMR and MRI, in order to extend their applicability and enhance their capability to investigate molecular structure, organization and function from materials to organisms. Examples of methodologies emanating from these efforts include: novel polarization and detection methods, ex-situ and mobile NMR and MRI, laser-polarized NMR and MRI, functionalized NMR biosensors and molecular imaging, ultralow and zero-field SQUID NMR and MRI, remote detection of NMR and MRI amplified by means of laser magnetometers, and miniaturization including fluid flow through porous materials and "microfluidic chemistry and NMR/MRI on a chip". The second component of his research program involves the application of such novel methods to problems in chemistry, materials science, and biomedicine.

== Awards ==
Among his many prestigious awards and honors, Pines received the Langmuir Medal of the American Chemical Society, the Faraday Medal of the Royal Society of Chemistry, the Wolf Prize for Chemistry (together with Richard R. Ernst) in 1991. He was awarded the F.A. Cotton Medal for Excellence in Chemical Research of the American Chemical Society in 1999. In 2005, an Ampere Symposium was held in honor of Pines' 60th birthday in Chamonix, France, and in 2008, he was awarded the Russell Varian Prize at the European Magnetic Resonance Conference. (Previous Varian Prizes winners: Jean Jeener, Erwin Hahn, Nicolaas Bloembergen, John. S. Waugh, and Alfred G. Redfield.) Pines was also recognized by numerous teaching honors, including the University of California's Distinguished Teaching Award. He was a member of the U.S. National Academy of Sciences, the American Academy of Arts and Sciences and a Foreign Member of the Royal Society (London); he was Doctor Honoris Causa at the Weizmann Institute of Science, Universite Paul Cezanne, University of Paris and the University of Rome, and past President of the International Society of Magnetic Resonance.
