= Geoffrey Bodenhausen =

French chemist

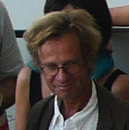
- Geoffrey Bodenhausen in 2009
- Born: 7 May 1951 (age 75); The Hague, Netherlands
- Education: University of Oxford
- Known for: HSQC
- Scientific career
- Fields: chemistry, spectroscopy
- Workplaces: École Polytechnique Fédérale de Lausanne, École Normale Supérieure of Paris
- Doctoral advisor: Ray Freeman
- Doctoral students: Lyndon Emsley (1991)

Geoffrey Bodenhausen (born 7 May 1951) is a French chemist whose research focuses on nuclear magnetic resonance (NMR) spectroscopy. Born in The Hague, he studied chemistry at ETH Zurich and received a D.Phil. from the University of Oxford under the supervision of Ray Freeman. His research has included multidimensional NMR spectroscopy, coherence transfer, relaxation, solid-state NMR, long-lived spin states and hyperpolarization methods. He is a Fellow of the American Physical Society and a corresponding member of the Royal Netherlands Academy of Arts and Sciences.

Bodenhausen was professor of chemistry at the École Normale Supérieure (ENS) in Paris from 1996 and became professor emeritus in 2019. He also held a part-time professorship at the École Polytechnique Fédérale de Lausanne (EPFL) until 2016 and is listed by EPFL as a professor emeritus and honorary professor.

== Education ==
Bodenhausen was born on 7 May 1951 in The Hague, Netherlands. He was educated at the École Internationale de Genève before studying chemistry at ETH Zurich, where he received his diploma in 1974. He then studied at the University of Oxford, receiving a D.Phil. in 1977 under Ray Freeman. His doctoral work was conducted during the early development of two-dimensional NMR spectroscopy.

== Career ==
Following his doctorate, Bodenhausen carried out postdoctoral research with Robert L. Vold and Regitze R. Vold at the University of California, San Diego. He subsequently worked at the Massachusetts Institute of Technology with Leo Neuringer and Robert G. Griffin. In 1980 he joined the research group of Richard R. Ernst at ETH Zurich, where he worked on two-dimensional spectroscopy, relaxation, solid-state NMR and coherence-transfer methods.

In 1985 Bodenhausen was appointed associate professor at the University of Lausanne. During his time at Lausanne he developed research programs in NMR spectroscopy and held responsibility for the Institute of Organic Chemistry. From 1994 to 1996 he was professor of chemistry at Florida State University in Tallahassee and directed the NMR program at the National High Magnetic Field Laboratory.

In 1996 he became professor of chemistry at the École Normale Supérieure in Paris. He simultaneously resumed a part-time position at the University of Lausanne, which became associated with EPFL following the transfer of the university's chemistry activities. He continued his work in Lausanne until 2016.

From 2005 to 2011 he chaired the Board of Trustees of EUROMAR.

Bodenhausen became professor emeritus at ENS in 2019. ENS described him in 2021 as professor emeritus of the institution, while EPFL currently lists him as professor emeritus and honorary professor.

From 2005 to 2011 he chaired the Board of Trustees of EUROMAR, a European organization associated with magnetic resonance research.

== Research ==
Bodenhausen's research has covered several areas of NMR spectroscopy, including multidimensional spectroscopy, coherence transfer, relaxation, phase cycling, solid-state NMR and hyperpolarization. A 2023 Festschrift published in the journal Magnetic Resonance described his work as encompassing major developments in modern NMR methodology, including two-dimensional NMR, coherence transfer and pathway selection, indirect detection of insensitive nuclei, multiple-quantum spectroscopy, product-operator formalism and long-lived spin states.

=== Multidimensional NMR and selective excitation ===
During his doctoral work with Ray Freeman, Gareth Morris, Bodenhausen contributed to the development of two-dimensional NMR and to methods for selective excitation. In 1976 Morris and Freeman described a pulse sequence for selective excitation of portions of coupled NMR spectra. The method was subsequently named DANTE by Freeman and Gareth Morris.

He also contributed to early work on heteronuclear NMR experiments. In 1977 Bodenhausen and Freeman demonstrated indirect detection of proton resonances through observation of a heteronucleus, establishing correlations between proton and heteronuclear chemical shifts.

=== HSQC ===
In 1980 Bodenhausen and D. J. Ruben introduced the heteronuclear single quantum coherence (HSQC) experiment. Their paper, "Natural abundance nitrogen-15 NMR by enhanced heteronuclear spectroscopy", described a two-dimensional Fourier-transform method using polarization transfer to enhance the observation of nitrogen-15 nuclei at natural abundance. HSQC subsequently became a widely used experiment in solution NMR, including the study of organic molecules and proteins. The experiment correlates the chemical shifts of protons with those of heteronuclei such as carbon-13 or nitrogen-15 and became a basis for numerous later heteronuclear NMR experiments.

=== Multiple-quantum spectroscopy and relaxation ===
Bodenhausen also conducted early work on multiple-quantum spectroscopy and NMR relaxation. With Robert and Regitze Vold he published Multiple-Quantum Spin-Echo Spectroscopy in 1980, describing multiple-quantum spin echoes and their detection using two-dimensional Fourier-transform spectroscopy.

His work also included the use of relaxation measurements to investigate molecular motion. A 1978 paper with N. M. Szeverenyi and Robert and Regitze Vold used transverse relaxation of multiple-quantum coherence as a probe of molecular motion.

=== Coherence transfer and product operators ===
Bodenhausen's research at ETH Zurich contributed to the development of systematic descriptions of coherence-transfer pathways and phase cycling in NMR pulse experiments. With Herbert Kogler and Richard Ernst he published a 1984 study describing methods for selecting coherence-transfer pathways in NMR pulse experiments.

He was also a coauthor, with Ole W. Sørensen, Malcolm H. Levitt, Gerhard Eich and Richard Ernst, of work on the product-operator formalism for describing NMR pulse experiments. The formalism provided a systematic framework for analysing the evolution of coupled spin systems during pulse sequences and became widely used in NMR methodology.

=== Solid-state NMR ===
Bodenhausen also worked on solid-state NMR. In collaboration with Michael Munowitz, Robert Griffin and T. H. Huang, he reported a two-dimensional rotational spin-echo experiment that combined magic-angle spinning with correlations between chemical-shift and dipolar interactions.

=== Two-dimensional ion cyclotron resonance ===
In the 1980s, Bodenhausen and collaborators developed two-dimensional Fourier-transform ion cyclotron resonance (2D FT-ICR) mass spectrometry, applying concepts from two-dimensional nuclear magnetic resonance to mass spectrometry. Their 1987 experiments demonstrated the detection of ion–molecule reactions and mass-transfer processes using the technique. Subsequent work extended the method to broadband measurements of ion–molecule reactions.

=== Long-lived spin states and hyperpolarization ===
Later in his career, Bodenhausen worked extensively on long-lived spin states and hyperpolarization. His research group investigated long-lived coherences and singlet states as tools for studying slow molecular processes and for extending the lifetime of nuclear-spin polarization.

His later work also focused on dissolution dynamic nuclear polarization (D-DNP), a hyperpolarization method for increasing the sensitivity of NMR spectroscopy. ENS reported that the 2019 Günther Laukien Prize recognized his work on solution-state NMR, including earlier developments such as DANTE and HSQC and more recent work involving dissolution DNP. His work in this area included methods for preparing hyperpolarized solutions and microstructured materials for dissolution-DNP experiments.

== Editorial work ==
Bodenhausen has served on the editorial board of Progress in Nuclear Magnetic Resonance Spectroscopy. He was part of the journal's editorial team during the publication of its 50th-anniversary editorial in 2016. He is an executive editor of Magnetic Resonance, an open-access journal published by the Groupement AMPERE. The journal's editorial board currently lists Bodenhausen among its executive editors.

== Honours and awards ==
- 1990: National Latsis Prize awarded by the Swiss National Science Foundation with support of the Latsis Foundation.
- 1993: Doctor honoris causa, University of Stockholm.
- 1997: Corresponding member (Correspondent) of the Royal Netherlands Academy of Arts and Sciences.
- 2006: Catalan-Sabatier Prize of the Spanish Royal Society of Chemistry
- 2008: Fellow of the International Society for Magnetic Resonance.

== Books ==
- Ernst, Richard; Bodenhausen, Geoffrey; Wokaun, Alexander (1987). Principles of Nuclear Magnetic Resonance in One and Two Dimension. Clarendon Press. p. 690. ISBN 9780198556473.

== Selected publications ==
- Bodenhausen, Geoffrey; Vold, Robert L.; Vold, Regitze R. (1980). "Multiple-quantum spin-echo spectroscopy". Journal of Magnetic Resonance. 37 (1): 93–106.
- Bodenhausen, Geoffrey; Ruben, D. J. (1980). "Natural abundance nitrogen-15 NMR by enhanced heteronuclear spectroscopy". Chemical Physics Letters. 69 (1): 185–189.
- Munowitz, Michael G.; Griffin, Robert G.; Bodenhausen, Geoffrey; Huang, T. H. (1981). "Two-dimensional rotational spin-echo nuclear magnetic resonance in solids: Correlation of chemical shift and dipolar interactions". Journal of the American Chemical Society. 103 (9): 2529–2533.
- Sørensen, Ole W.; Eich, Gerhard W.; Levitt, Malcolm H.; Bodenhausen, Geoffrey; Ernst, Richard R. (1983). "Product operator formalism for the description of NMR pulse experiments". Progress in Nuclear Magnetic Resonance Spectroscopy. 16: 163–192.
- Bodenhausen, Geoffrey; Kogler, Herbert; Ernst, Richard R. (1984). "Selection of coherence-transfer pathways in NMR pulse experiments". Journal of Magnetic Resonance. 58 (3): 370–388.

== Patents ==
- DE Patent 3839820, Lyndon Emsley & Geoffrey Bodenhausen, "Verfahren zum selektiven Anregen von nmr-Signalen", issued May 31, 1990
- DE Patent 3940633, Lyndon Emsley & Geoffrey Bodenhausen, "Gauss-Impuls-Kaskade", issued June 13, 1991
- US Patent 5327086, Geoffrey Bodenhausen; Jean-Marc Boehlen & Irene Burghardt, "Multiple-quantum NMR with frequency-modulated chirp pulses", issued July 5, 1994
- US Patent 2009039883, Geoffrey Bodenhausen; Paul Vasos & Riddhiman Sarkar, "Singlet-state exchange NMR spectroscopy for the study of very slow dynamic processes", issued February 12, 2009
- US Patent 2012286782, Sami Jannin; Aurelien Bornet & Geoffrey Bodenhausen, "Method for NMR spectroscopy with sustained induction decays of long-lived coherences", issued November 15, 2012
- US Patent 2013021031, Diego Carnvale & Geoffrey Bodenhausen, "Fourier Tickling For Homonuclear Decoupling in NMR"
- EP Patent 2786165, Geoffrey Bodenhausen; Aurelien Bornet & Roberto Buratto et al., "Method for the NMR based determination of the affinity of drugs for a target protein", issued December 8, 2014
