= Mathias Nilsson =

Swedish chemist

- Born: Mathias Nilsson
- Education: Linnaeus University (Bsc.); Swedish University of Agricultural Sciences(PhD)
- Known for: Liquids NMR Spectroscopy
- Awards: BRSG-NMRDG Prize (2010)
- Scientific career
- Fields: Physical Chemistry; Analytical Chemistry
- Institutions: The University of Manchester
- Thesis: The dietary fibre complex of rye grain, with emphasis on arabinoxylan (1999)
- Doctoral advisor: Prof. Per Åman

Mathias Nilsson is a Swedish chemist and a professor in the Department of Chemistry at The University of Manchester. His research in general is based on physical chemistry and analytical chemistry, specifically on development and application of novel methods in liquids NMR spectroscopy

== Education ==
Nilsson completed his Bachelor of Science degree in food chemistry in 1993 at Linnaeus University. He then read for his Doctor of Philosophy degree at Swedish University of Agricultural Sciences on The dietary fibre complex of rye grain, with emphasis on arabinoxylan and successfully completed it in 1999. His PhD was supervised by Per Åman.

== Research and career ==
Upon completing his PhD, Nilsson spent two years (2002–2003) at Aveiro, Portugal as a postdoctoral research associate working on food science and NMR. In 2003, he joined the University of Manchester as a postdoctoral research associate and in 2007 was granted an EPSRC Advance Research Fellowship. In 2012, he became a lecturer, and was later on promoted to the position of reader in 2013 and then to the position of professor of physical chemistry in 2018. During the period of 2012 to 2015, he also held a joint position as an associate professor at University of Copenhagen.

Nilsson's research in general is based on physical chemistry and analytical chemistry, specifically on the development and application of novel methods in liquids NMR spectroscopy.

Apart from research and lecturing, Nilsson also is part of the NMR Group at University of Manchester along with Gareth A. Morris, Ralph Adams. He was the co-organiser of the Pure Shift Workshop held on 2017 at University of Manchester. He was also one of the invited speakers at the 12th Australian and New Zealand Society for Magnetic Resonance Conference (ANZMAG) in 2019.

=== Notable work ===
In 2010, Nilsson participated in a research which was able to show that suppressing multiplet structure in ^{1}H NMR is able to enhance the resolution of spectra significantly, even to the extent of a GHz range spectrometer. This Pure Shift technique can be also extended to multidimensional spectroscopic techniques including DOSY. The issue with NMR sensitivity and resolution is that complex multiplets maybe caused by homonuclear scalar coupling and the suppression will significantly reduce the density of signals in a spectrum. The research showed how Second Generation Pure Shift Techniques can be used in such cases without causing such disruption to the spectra, and further, giving resolution equivalent to spectrometers of several GHz with mM sensitivity.

Nilsson also developed the DOSY Toolbox in 2009, a free program for processing PFG NMR diffusion data. The Toolbox is completely free-standing in the sense that all necessary basic processing of NMR data is catered for within the programme, as well as a number of methods specific to DOSY data (e.g., DOSY and SCORE).

=== Awards and nominations ===
- BRSG-NMRDG Prize (2010)

== Major publications ==
- Nilsson, Mathias; Foroozandeh, Mohammadali; Adams, Ralph W.; Meharry, Nicola J.; Jeannerat, Damien; Morris, Gareth A. (2014). "Ultrahigh‐Resolution NMR Spectroscopy". Angewandte Chemie International Edition. 53 (27): 6990–6992. doi:10.1002/anie.201404111. PMC 4320760. PMID 24861024.
- Nilsson, Mathias; Evans, Robert; Deng, Zhaoxia; Rogerson, Alexandria K.; McLachlan, Andy S.; Morris, Gareth A.; Richards, Jeff J. (2013). "Quantitative Interpretation of Diffusion‐Ordered NMR Spectra: Can We Rationalize Small Molecule Diffusion Coefficients?". Angewandte Chemie International Edition. 52 (11): 3199–3202. doi:10.1002/anie.201207403. PMID 23365047.
- Nilsson, Mathias; Aguilar, Juan A.; Bodenhausen, Geoffrey; Morris, Gareth A. (2012). "Spin echo NMR spectra without J modulation". Chemical Communications. 48 (6): 811–813. doi:10.1039/C1CC16699A. PMID 22143456.
- Nilsson, Mathias; Aguilar, Juan A.; Faulkner, Stephen; Morris, Gareth A. (2010). "Pure Shift ^{1}H NMR: A Resolution of the Resolution Problem?". Angewandte Chemie International Edition. 49 (23): 3901–3903. doi:10.1002/anie.201001107. PMID 20401889.
- Nilsson, Mathias (2009). "The DOSY Toolbox: A new tool for processing PFG NMR diffusion data". Journal of Magnetic Resonance. 200 (2): 296–302. Bibcode:2009JMagR.200..296N. doi:10.1016/j.jmr.2009.07.022. PMID 19666235.
