= Debabrata Goswami =

Indian chemist

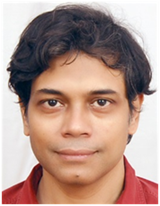
- Born: 31 August 1964 (age 61); Ichapur, West Bengal
- Citizenship: Indian
- Education: Jadavpur University, BSc, Indian Institute of Technology Kanpur, MSc, Princeton University, PhD
- Known for: Work in the field of Quantum computing and Nonlinear optics
- Awards: OSA Fellow (2018); Fellow of the Royal Society of Chemistry (2015); SPIE Fellow (2019); ICO Galileo Galilei Award (2018); Prof. Y.T. Thathachari Research Award (2012); Swarnajayanti Fellowship (2004); Wellcome Trust Senior Research Fellowship (2004)
- Scientific career
- Fields: Chemistry, Physics
- Workplaces: Princeton University, 1997-1998; Tata Institute of Fundamental Research, 1998–2004; Indian Institute of Technology Kanpur, 2004-2020
- Thesis: Control of Chemical Dynamics using Arbitrary Shaped Optical Pulses and Laser Enhanced NMR Spectroscopy (1994)
- Doctoral advisor: Warren S. Warren

Debabrata Goswami FInstP FRSC, (Devanagari गोस्वामी) is an Indian chemist and the Prof. S. Sampath Chair Professor of Chemistry, at the Indian Institute of Technology Kanpur. He is also a professor (Higher Administrative Grade) of The Department of Chemistry and The Center for Lasers & Photonics at the same Institute. Goswami is an associate editor of the open-access journal Science Advances. He is also an Academic Editor for PLOS One and PeerJ Chemistry. He has contributed to the theory of Quantum Computing as well as nonlinear optical spectroscopy. His work is documented in more than 200 research publications. He is an elected Fellow of the Royal Society of Chemistry, Fellow of the Institute of Physics, the SPIE, and The Optical Society. He is also a Senior Member of the IEEE, has been awarded a Swarnajayanti Fellowship for Chemical Sciences, and has held a Wellcome Trust Senior Research Fellowship. He is the third Indian to be awarded the International Commission for Optics Galileo Galilei Medal for excellence in optics.

== Scholarship ==
In 2017, he was elected Fellow of the Optical Society of America "for seminal and significant contributions in ultrafast optical instrumentation for exploitation in cross-disciplinary fields like quantum information and biomedical applications as well as pedagogy in optics and photonics and voluntary services to OSA" (Engineering and Science Research).

Goswami has demonstrated near-IR rapid Femtosecond Laser pulse shaping in the Megahertz repetition domain, which is the current state of the art metric for the generation of shaped laser pulses. This latest demonstration of rapid near-IR femtosecond pulse shaping is based on his original approach of Fourier Transform Femtosecond Pulse Shaping that utilizes a programmable traveling wave grating in an acousto-optic modulator. Pushing the limits of current technology and the realization of improved standards of experimentation has been a coherent part of his research narrative. His approach to Femtosecond pulse shaping has been crucial for applications from the demonstration of control in the gas phase fragmentation reactions to 2D IR spectroscopy and quantum computing.

His work has built upon a history of over thirty years of working on pulsed laser experiments and has established other milestones in the field. He developed the self-calibrated femtosecond optical tweezers method for reproducible pulsed laser optical tweezers experiments with an additional forced oscillatory mode of motion. He went on to use the femtosecond optical tweezers to provide a direct measure and control of 'in situ' temperature and viscosity at micro-scale volumes. He used this method to directly detect colloidal assembly, their structure, and orientation, which affirmed the spatiotemporal aspects of the method.

Breaking the barrier of programmable pulsed laser generation has been concomitant to his insights into the theoretical aspects of pulsed light and heat dissipation dynamics. His work on the cumulative thermal effects of femtosecond infrared lasers, has revolutionized the existing framework of laser heat dissipation. This has in turn been shown to be the key to mitigating the deleterious effect of heat accumulation during sensitive measurements of nonlinear optical properties. Further, this led to the first demonstration of the hitherto unexplored distinction between molecular structures with femtosecond laser-induced thermal spectroscopy. Femtosecond thermal spectroscopy with infrared lasers has thus become a new spectroscopic identification method.

In more direct applications of the experimental framework driving his work, he has demonstrated how to distinguish overlapping fluorophores in multi-photon imaging microscopy using near-IR high repetition rate femtosecond lasers by exploiting repeated excitation and de-excitation processes that help to distinguish and eventually eliminate abnormal cells from healthy ones.

== Education ==
B.Sc. Jadavpur University, 1986. M.Sc. IIT Kanpur, 1988.Princeton University, M.A. 1990; Ph.D. 1994. PDF at Harvard University, 1993–94. His work at Princeton overlapped with future Nobel laureate in physics Donna Strickland.

== Career ==
After graduating, he spent two years at the Brookhaven National Laboratory from 1994 to 1996 before spending a year at Quantronix Corporation in 1997. He returned to the Princeton University Center for Ultrafast Laser Labs in 1998. He returned to India to join the Tata Institute of Fundamental Research as a Fellow-E in 1998 as part of the DNAP (Department of Nuclear and Atomic Physics). In 2003, He moved to the Indian Institute of Technology Kanpur, his alma-mater, to join the Department of Chemistry as an associate professor and has remained there since, currently as a professor (Higher Administrative Grade). He was awarded the Prof. S. Sampath Chair Professorship of Chemistry in 2018. He also holds a joint appointment at the same institute in The Center for Lasers & Photonics.

== Outreach ==
- National Programme on Technology Enhanced Learning course on Quantum Computing
- Ultrafast Laser Virtual Lab
