= Cross-polarization =

Spectroscopy technique

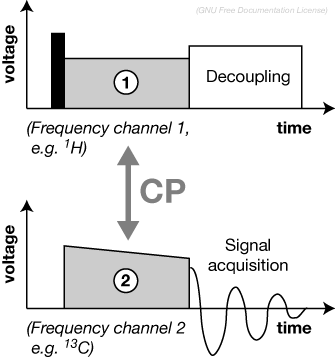
The CP pulse sequence. The sequence starts with a 90º pulse on the abundant channel (typically H). Then CP contact pulses matching the Hartmann-Hahn condition are applied to transfer the magnetization from H to X. Finally, the free induction decay (FID) of the X nuclei is detected, typically with ^{1}H decoupling.

Cross-polarization (CP), originally published in 1962 as nuclear double resonance in the rotating frame by Sven R. Hartmann and Erwin Hahn is a solid-state nuclear magnetic resonance (ssNMR) technique used to transfer nuclear magnetization from different types of nuclei via heteronuclear dipolar interactions. The ^{1}H-X cross-polarization dramatically improves the sensitivity of ssNMR experiments of most experiments involving spin-1/2 nuclei, capitalizing on the higher ^{1}H polarization, and shorter T_{1}(^{1}H) relaxation times.

In 1972 CP was crucially adapted to magic angle spinning (MAS) by Michael Gibby, Alexander Pines and John S. Waugh at the Massachusetts Institute of Technology who adapted a variant of the Hartmann and Hahn experiment designed by Lurie and Slichter. The technique is now widely known as CPMAS.

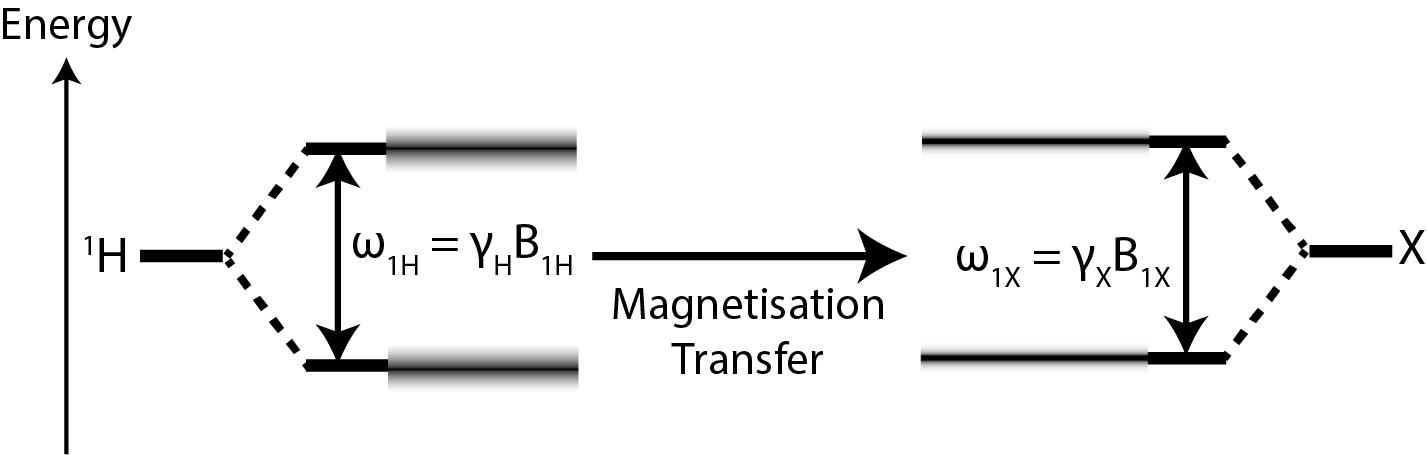
When the Hartmann Hahn condition is matched, energy levels align in the RF rotating frame, allowing the magnetization transfer.

In CP, the natural nuclear polarization of an abundant spin (typically ^{1}H) is exploited to increase the polarization of a rare spin (such as ^{13}C, ^{15}N, ^{31}P) by irradiating the sample with radio waves at the frequencies matching the Hartmann–Hahn condition:

$$\gamma_H B_1(^{1}\text{H}) = \gamma_X B_1(\text{X}) \pm n \omega_R$$

where $\gamma$ are the gyromagnetic ratios, $\omega_R$ is the spinning rate, and $n$ is an integer. This process is sometimes referred to as "spin-locking". The power of one contact pulse is typically ramped to achieve a more broadband and efficient magnetization transfer.

The evolution of the X NMR signal intensity during the cross polarization is a build-up and decay process whose time axis is usually referred to as the "contact time". At short CP contact times, a build-up of X magnetization occurs, during which the transfer of ^{1}H magnetization from nearby spins (and remote spins through proton spin diffusion) to X occurs. For longer CP contact times, the X magnetization decreases from T_{1ρ}(X) relaxation, i.e. the decay of the magnetization during a spin lock.
