= Malcolm Levitt =

British chemist

- Born: Malcolm Harris Levitt; 1957 (age 68–69); Kingston upon Hull, East Riding of Yorkshire, England, United Kingdom
- Education: University of Oxford (BA 1978, DPhil 1981)
- Awards: Günther Laukien Prize, Russell Varian Prize, Davy Medal
- Scientific career
- Workplaces: University of Southampton
- Thesis: New techniques in nuclear magnetic resonance (1981)
- Doctoral advisor: Ray Freeman

Malcolm Harris Levitt (born 1957) is a British physical chemist and nuclear magnetic resonance (NMR) spectroscopist. He is Professor of Physical Chemistry at the University of Southampton and was elected a Fellow of the Royal Society in 2007. Levitt is known for his significant contributions to NMR spectroscopy, including the invention of composite pulse and composite pulse decoupling sequences in solution NMR, the development of symmetry-based recoupling and decoupling sequences in solid-state NMR, and research on long-lived nuclear spin states. He is also the author of the textbook "Spin Dynamics: Basics of Nuclear Magnetic Resonance" and has published extensively on the quantum mechanics and spectroscopy of endofullerenes. Levitt has received numerous prestigious awards for his work, including the Günther Laukien Prize in 2008, the Russell Varian Prize in 2015, and the Davy Medal of the Royal Society in 2021.

== Education and career ==
Levitt studied chemistry at the University of Oxford, at Keble College. As an undergraduate, he enjoyed lectures by Ray Freeman, who was by then already an established and prominent NMR spectroscopist. After working on an undergraduate research project with Freeman, Levitt continued to work under the supervision of Freeman for his doctorate, and since then was involved in research in the field of NMR.

Levitt undertook a series of international postdoctoral research stays after completing his doctorate. In 1982, he worked with Shimon Vega at the Weizmann Institute of Science in Israel. In 1982–1985, he worked with Richard Ernst at ETH Zurich. He was a staff scientist at the Francis Bitter National Magnet Laboratory at MIT in 1990–1997.

He became a lecturer at Stockholm University, Sweden in 1991 and was subsequently promoted to professor. In 2001 he moved to the School of Chemistry at the University of Southampton, UK.

== Research ==
Levitt is best known as the inventor of the composite pulse and composite pulse decoupling sequences in solution NMR. Other contributions to NMR spectroscopy include the development of symmetry-based recoupling and decoupling sequences in solid-state NMR, and the use of long-lived nuclear spin states and singlet states in solution NMR.

He is also the author of the textbook Spin Dynamics. Basics of Nuclear Magnetic Resonance.

He has also published extensively on the quantum mechanics and spectroscopy of endofullerenes. Techniques used include terahertz and infrared spectroscopy, and inelastic neutron scattering, as well as NMR.

== Awards and honours ==
Levitt was awarded the Günther Laukien Prize in Magnetic Resonance in 2008 for his work on "optimized pulses and pulse sequences to enhance the power of liquid and solid state NMR". He was awarded the final Russell Varian Prize in Nuclear Magnetic Resonance in 2015 for his work on composite pulses. He was awarded the Davy Medal of the Royal Society in 2021.

As a lecturer at Stockholm University, Levitt was awarded the Göran Gustafsson Prize for Chemistry in 1996. As a postdoctoral researcher, Levitt was awarded the Latsis research prize of the ETH Zurich sponsored by the Latsis Foundation in 1985.

Levitt has been invited as the plenary speaker of major NMR academic conferences on multiple occasions, often in consecutive years.

== Early and personal life ==
Levitt was born in 1957 at Hull, England. He is married and has one daughter.
