= Warren S. Warren =

American professor

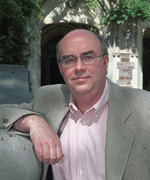
- Warren, 2002
- Born: August 16, 1955 (age 71); Detroit, Michigan, United States
- Education: Harvard University, AB; University of California, Berkeley, PhD
- Known for: Work in the field of Nuclear magnetic resonance and Nonlinear optics
- Awards: William F. Meggers Award in Spectroscopy (2018); Liversidge Award (2017); C.E.K. Mees Medal (2015); Herbert P. Broida Prize (2011)
- Scientific career
- Fields: Chemistry, Physics
- Workplaces: Princeton University, 1982–2005; Duke University, 2005–2011
- Thesis: Selectivity in Multiple Quantum Nuclear Magnetic Resonance (1980)
- Doctoral advisor: Alexander Pines

Warren Sloan Warren is the James B. Duke Professor of Chemistry and director of the Center for Molecular and Biomolecular Imaging at Duke University. He is also a professor of physics, Radiology, and Biomedical Engineering at the same institution. Warren is a deputy editor of the open-access journal Science Advances. He has contributed to the theory of Quantum Coherence as well as nonlinear optical spectroscopy.

== Scholarship ==
Warren began his career in the field of Magnetic Resonance, where his work contributed to the revised understanding of the interactions between widely separated spins. Warren would go on to exploit these "Intermolecular Multiple Quantum Coherences", and this work helped lead to the development of new pulse sequences for magnetic resonance imaging with new types of contrast. His work in nonlinear optics developed a range of optical methods which exploit laser pulse shaping to image molecular content, including tissue and paintings.

== Students and Collaborators ==
- Donna Strickland (University of Toronto) [postdoc]
- Debabrata Goswami (Indian Institute of Technology)
- Yung-ya Lin (UCLA)
- Thomas Theis (NCSU)
- Howe-Siang Tan (NTU)
- Louis Serge Bouchard (UCLA)
- Gigi Galiana (Yale)

== Books ==
- Warren, Warren S. The Physical Basis of Chemistry Vol. 1 Academic Press, 1993 ISBN 0127358501
- Warren, Warren S. The Physical Basis of Chemistry Vol. 2 Academic Press, 2000 ISBN 0127358552
