= Gareth A. Morris =

British scientist

Gareth Morris FRS
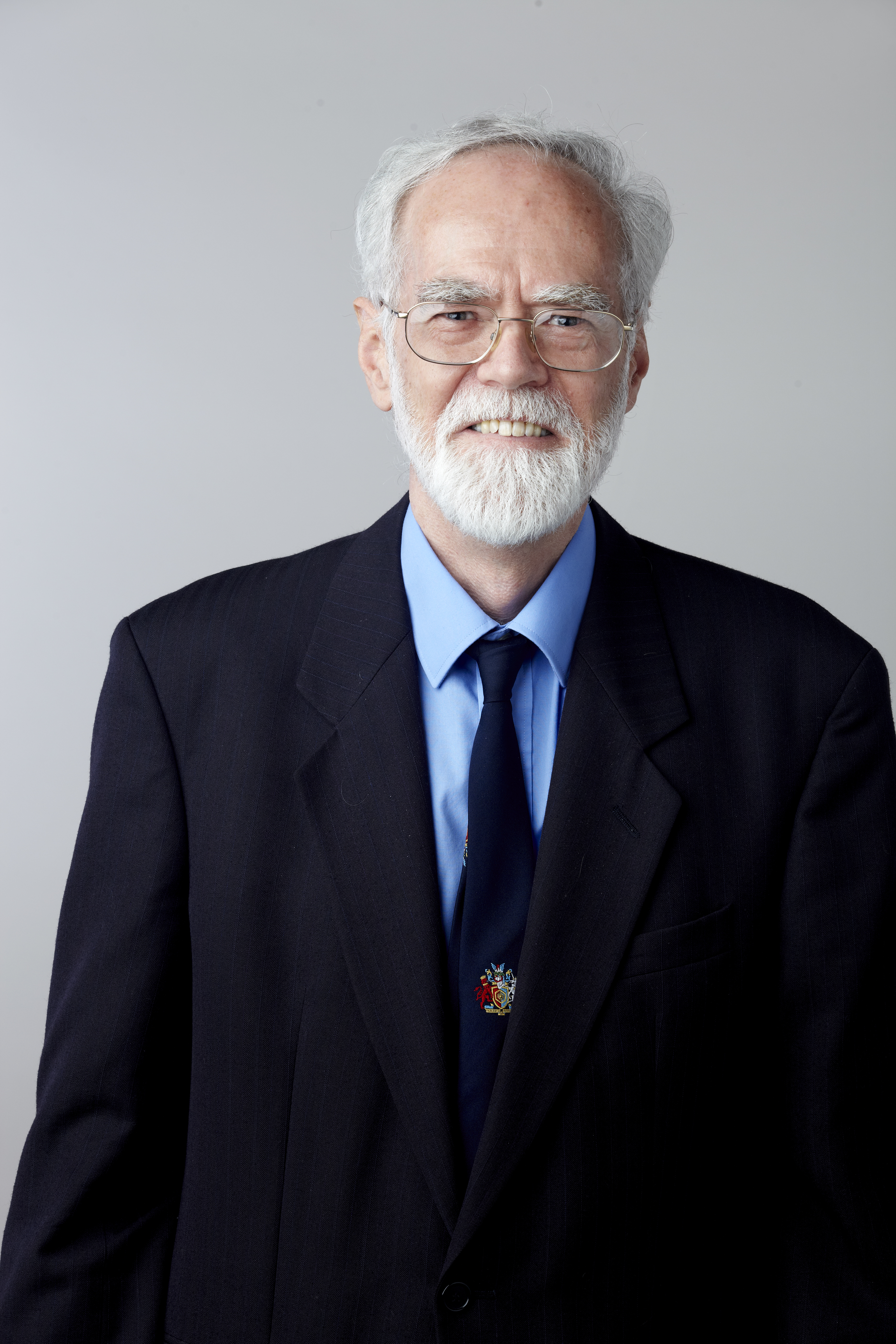
- Morris in 2014
- Born: Gareth Alun Morris; 6 July 1954 (age 71)
- Education: Royal Grammar School, Newcastle upon Tyne
- Alma mater: University of Oxford
- Known for: DANTE; INEPT
- Awards: Corday-Morgan Prize (1988); Russell Varian Prize (2011)
- Scientific career
- Fields: NMR spectroscopy
- Institutions: University of Manchester
- Thesis: New techniques in fourier transform nuclear magnetic resonance (1978)
- Doctoral advisor: Ray Freeman
- Website: manchester.ac.uk/research/gareth.morris

Gareth Alun Morris (born 6 July 1954) is a British scientist who is a Professor of Physical Chemistry, in the School of Chemistry at the University of Manchester.

== Education ==
Morris was educated at the Royal Grammar School, Newcastle and the University of Oxford where he was a student of Magdalen College, Oxford. He was awarded a Master of Arts degree followed by a Doctor of Philosophy degree in 1978.

== Research ==
Research in the NMR lab along with Mathias Nilsson, Jordi Burés and Ralph Adams involves the development of novel nuclear magnetic resonance spectroscopy techniques, and their application to problems in chemistry, biochemistry, and medicine.

=== Awards and honours ===
Morris was elected a Fellow of the Royal Society (FRS) in 2014. His nomination reads:

Gareth Morris is one of the world's foremost innovators in high resolution nuclear magnetic resonance spectroscopy, and has had a major influence on the determination of chemical structure by NMR. Almost all commercial NMR spectrometers contain hardware and software that he originated, including deuterium gradient shimming (now standard on commercial spectrometers) and ingenious pulse sequences such as DANTE (the prototypical selective excitation sequence) and INEPT (now a key component of multidimensional NMR techniques, including many of those used for protein 3D structure determination). The impact and wide applicability of Morris's contributions have made them indispensable components of the state-of-the-art NMR toolkit.

Morris received the James Shoolery Award 2015 awarded by SMASH (Small molecule NMR conference):

It is hard to imagine an NMR laboratory in the world which is not influenced daily by his developments from the foundations of INEPT and DANTE, through to modern gradient shimming, DOSY and pure shift methods.
