= Rafael Bruschweiler =

American physicist

Rafael Brüschweiler is a scientist who studies nuclear magnetic resonance (NMR). He is credited for the development of Covariance NMR, which shortens the NMR measurement time for multidimensional spectra of both solution and solid-state NMR. It also allows for easier analysis and interpretation. For this achievement he was awarded the Laukien Prize in NMR Spectroscopy at the 47th Experimental Nuclear Magnetic Resonance Conference (ENC). He is also a leading scientist in NMR-based metabolomics and protein NMR.

Rafael Brüschweiler is currently a professor of Dept. Chemistry & Biochemistry at Ohio State University since 2013 summer, and associate director for biophysics at the National High Magnetic Field Laboratory since 2004. He was a George M. Edgar Professor of Dept. Chemistry & Biochemistry at The Florida State University from 2004 to 2013. Prior to this he was a professor of chemistry at Clark University where he held the Gustaf H. Carlson Chair.

Rafael Brüschweiler obtained his Ph.D. in physical chemistry from ETH, Zürich under supervision of Nobel Laureate Richard R. Ernst, and did his postdoctoral research at the Scripps Research Institute (Advisor: P. E. Wright and D. A. Case). He is a fellow of the American Association for the Advancement of Science (AAAS) and a fellow of the American Physical Society (APS).
