= Pulse sequence =

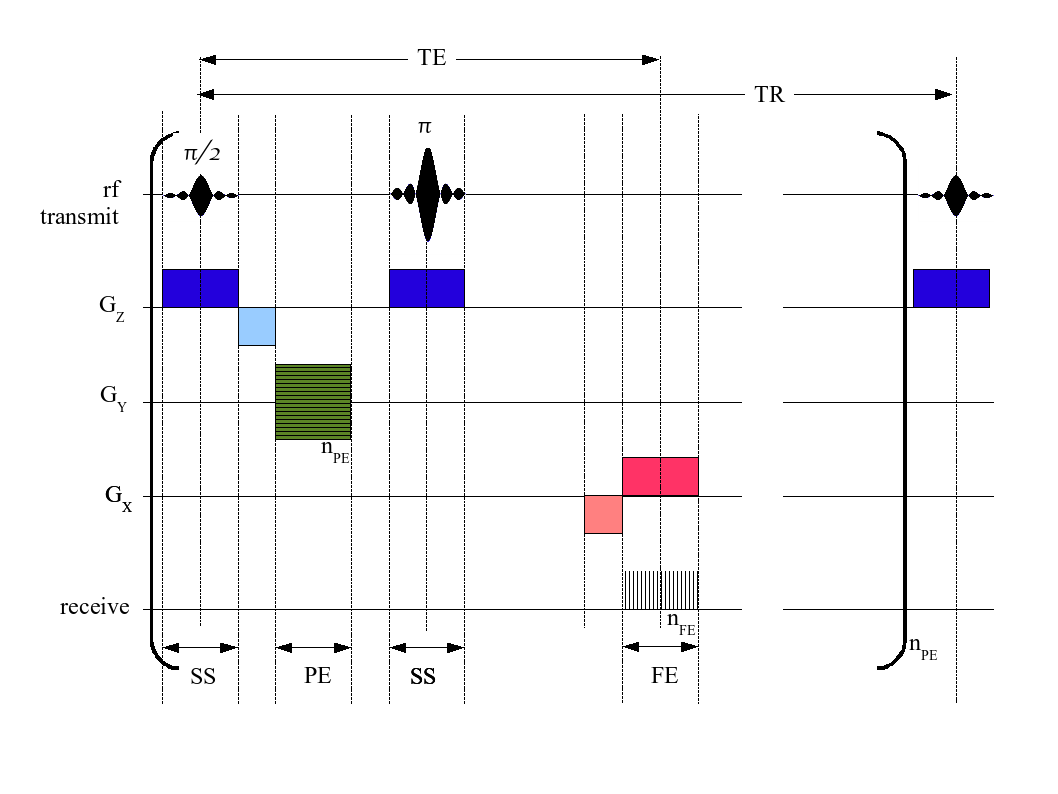
Timing diagram for an MRI spin echo pulse sequence.

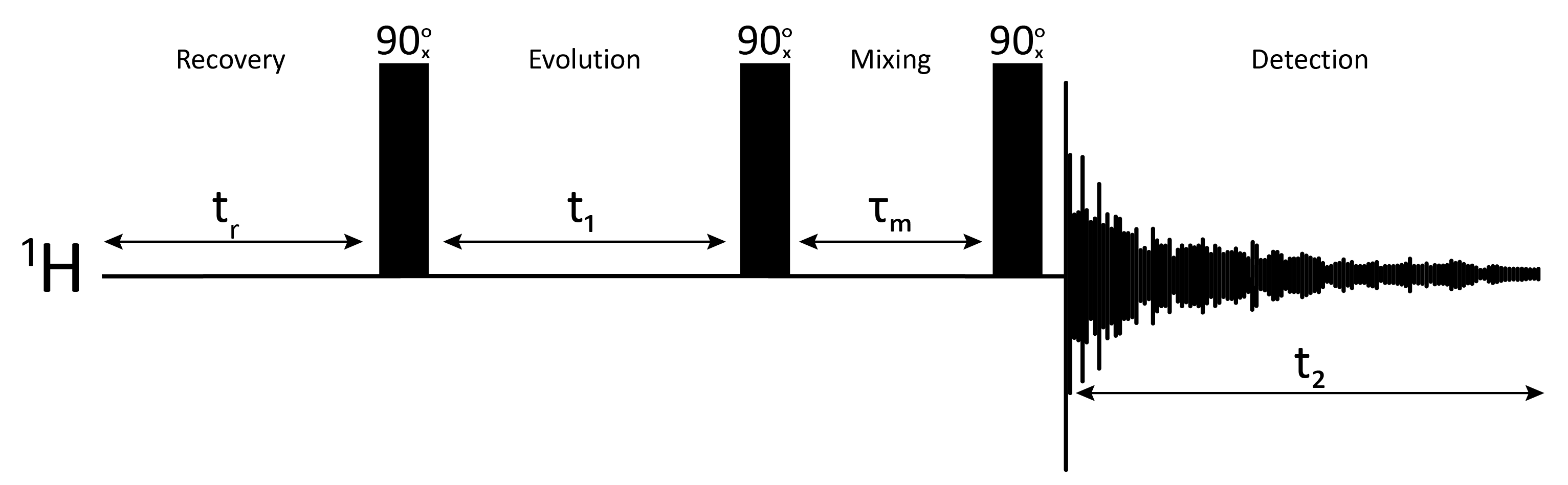
Graphical representation of a pulse sequence for a homonuclear NOESY experiment. The three bars represent three 90° pulses.

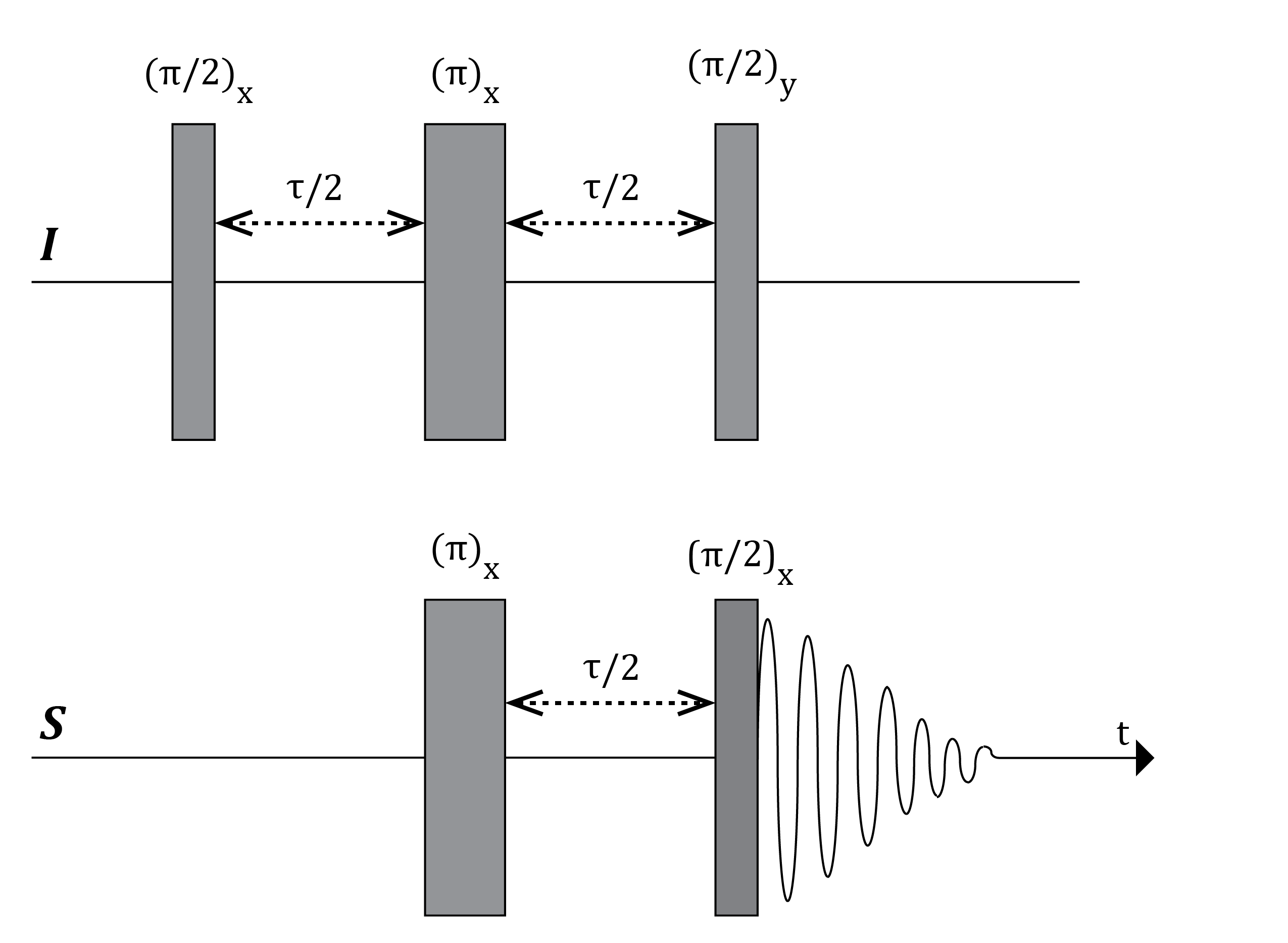
An INEPT NMR pulse sequence for a heteronuclear experiment. The thin bar denotes a 90° pulse, while the thick bar denotes a 180° pulse. INEPT is a common building block of NMR experiments to improve ^{^{15}}N signal.

In Fourier transform NMR spectroscopy and imaging, a pulse sequence describes a series of radio frequency pulses applied to the sample, such that the free induction decay is related to the characteristic frequencies of the desired signals. After applying a Fourier transform, the signal can be represented in the frequency domain as the NMR spectrum. In magnetic resonance imaging, additional gradient pulses are applied by switching magnetic fields that exhibit a space-dependent gradient which can be used to reconstruct spatially resolved images after applying Fourier transforms.

The outcome of pulse sequences is often analyzed using the product operator formalism.

== See also ==
- Spin echo
- Insensitive nuclei enhanced by polarization transfer
- MRI sequence
