= John S. Waugh =

American chemist

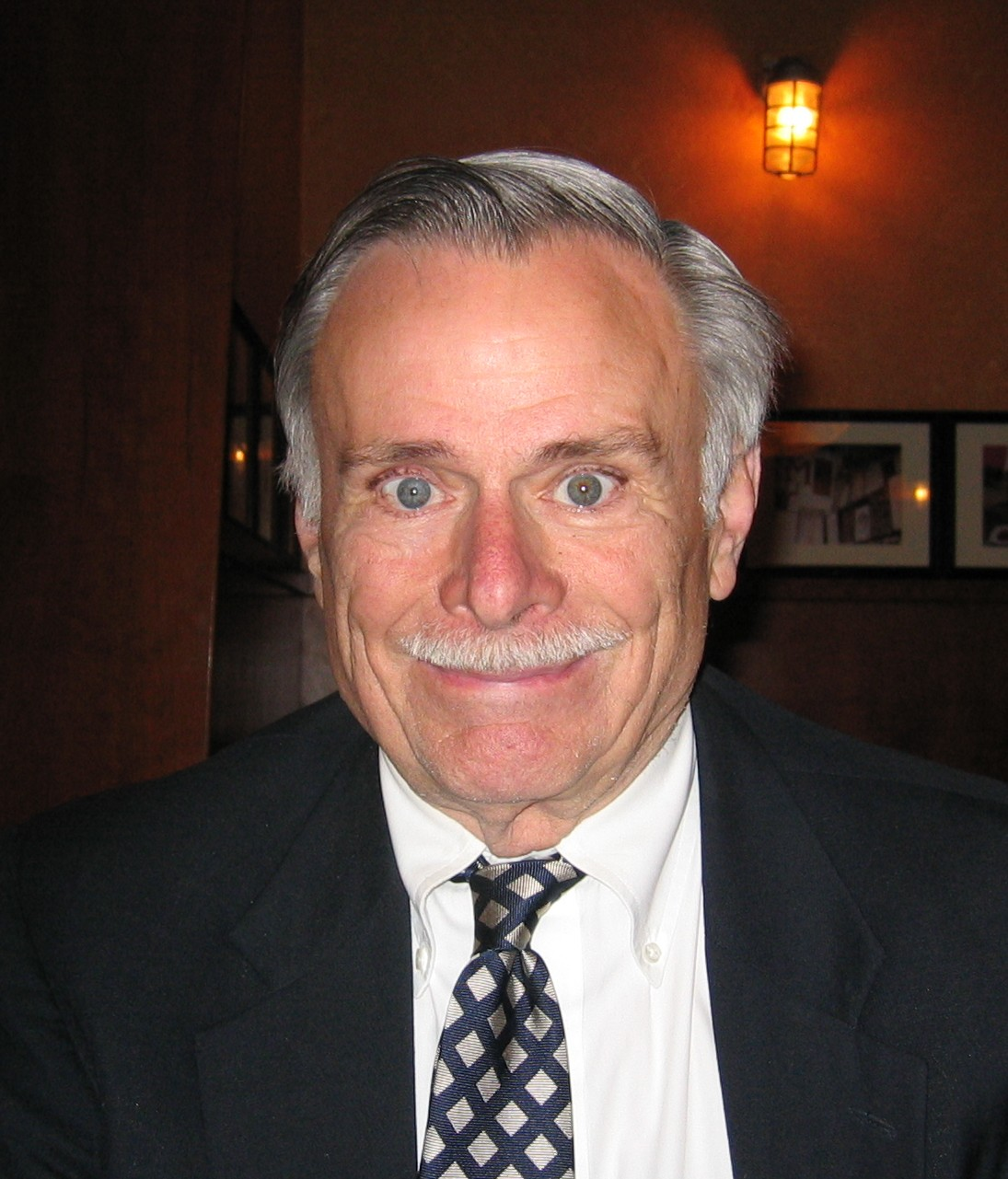
- Born: John Stewart Waugh; April 25, 1929; Willimantic, Connecticut
- Died: August 22, 2014 (aged 85); Concord, Massachusetts
- Education: Dartmouth College (A.B.) - 1949; California Institute of Technology (PhD) - 1953; Dartmouth College (ScD) - 1989
- Known for: Cross-polarization; NMR spectroscopy in solids Computational studies of spin systems
- Awards: Humboldt Prize (1972); Irving Langmuir Award (1976); Wolf Prize in Chemistry (1983); Linus Pauling Award (1984); Welch Award in Chemistry (2011)
- Scientific career
- Fields: chemical physics
- Workplaces: Massachusetts Institute of Technology
- Doctoral advisor: Don M. Yost
- Doctoral students: Alexander Pines
- Other notable students: Ulrich Haeberlen

John Stewart Waugh (April 25, 1929 – August 22, 2014) was an American chemist and Institute Professor at the Massachusetts Institute of Technology. He is known for developing average hamiltonian theory and using it to extend NMR spectroscopy, previously limited to liquids, to the solid state. He is the author of ANTIOPE, a freeware general purpose Windows-based simulator of the spectra and dynamics of nuclear magnetic resonance (NMR). He has also used systems of a few coupled spins to illustrate the general requirements for equilibrium and ergodicity in isolated systems.

In 1974 Waugh was elected as a member of the National Academy of Sciences (NAS), in the Chemistry section.

Waugh was awarded the Wolf Prize in Chemistry for 1983/84 with Herbert S. Gutowsky and Harden M. McConnell for their independent work on NMR spectroscopy. Waugh was cited for his "fundamental theoretical and experimental contributions to high resolution nuclear magnetic resonance spectroscopy in solids." In 2011, Waugh received the Welch Award in Chemistry for revolutionizing NMR spectroscopy. In the words of Ernest H. Cockrell, chair of the Welch Foundation, Waugh "discovered how to use NMR to study solids, creating a collection of tools that allows researchers to view the structures and properties of proteins, membranes, viruses, and many other critical components of life." His work continues to be used extensively in chemistry, physics, biology, materials science, and medicine. He died on August 22, 2014.

His father, Albert Waugh, was a professor of economics and statistics at the University of Connecticut, where he also served as provost for fifteen years.
