= Robert Tycko =

American biophysicist

Robert Tycko (born 1959) is an American biophysicist whose research primarily involves solid state NMR, including the development of new methods and applications to various areas of physics, chemistry, and biology. He is a member of the Laboratory of Chemical Physics in the National Institute of Diabetes and Digestive and Kidney Diseases at the National Institutes of Health in Bethesda, Maryland, USA. He was formerly a member of the Physical Chemistry Research and Materials Chemistry Research departments of AT&T Bell Labs in Murray Hill, New Jersey. His work has contributed to our understanding of geometric phases in spectroscopy, physical properties of fullerenes, skyrmions in 2D electron systems, protein folding, and amyloid fibrils associated with Alzheimer’s disease and prions.

== Education ==
In 1980, Tycko received his bachelor's degree from Princeton University, where he majored in chemistry. He received his Ph.D. in chemistry from the University of California at Berkeley, under the direction of Alexander Pines, and then did postdoctoral research at the University of Pennsylvania in the laboratory of Prof. Stanley J. Opella.

== Selected honors ==
- 1997: Fellow of American Physical Society
- 2001: NIH Director’s Award
- 2005: Fellow of the American Association for the Advancement of Science
- 2005: Earle K. Plyler Prize for Molecular Spectroscopy, American Physical Society
- 2007: Hillebrand Prize, Chemical Society of Washington
- 2008: Fellow of the International Society of Magnetic Resonance
- 2014: Christian B. Anfinsen Award of the Protein Society
- 2020: Elected Member of the United States National Academy of Sciences
