= Jean Jeener =

Belgian physical chemist and physicist (1931–2023)

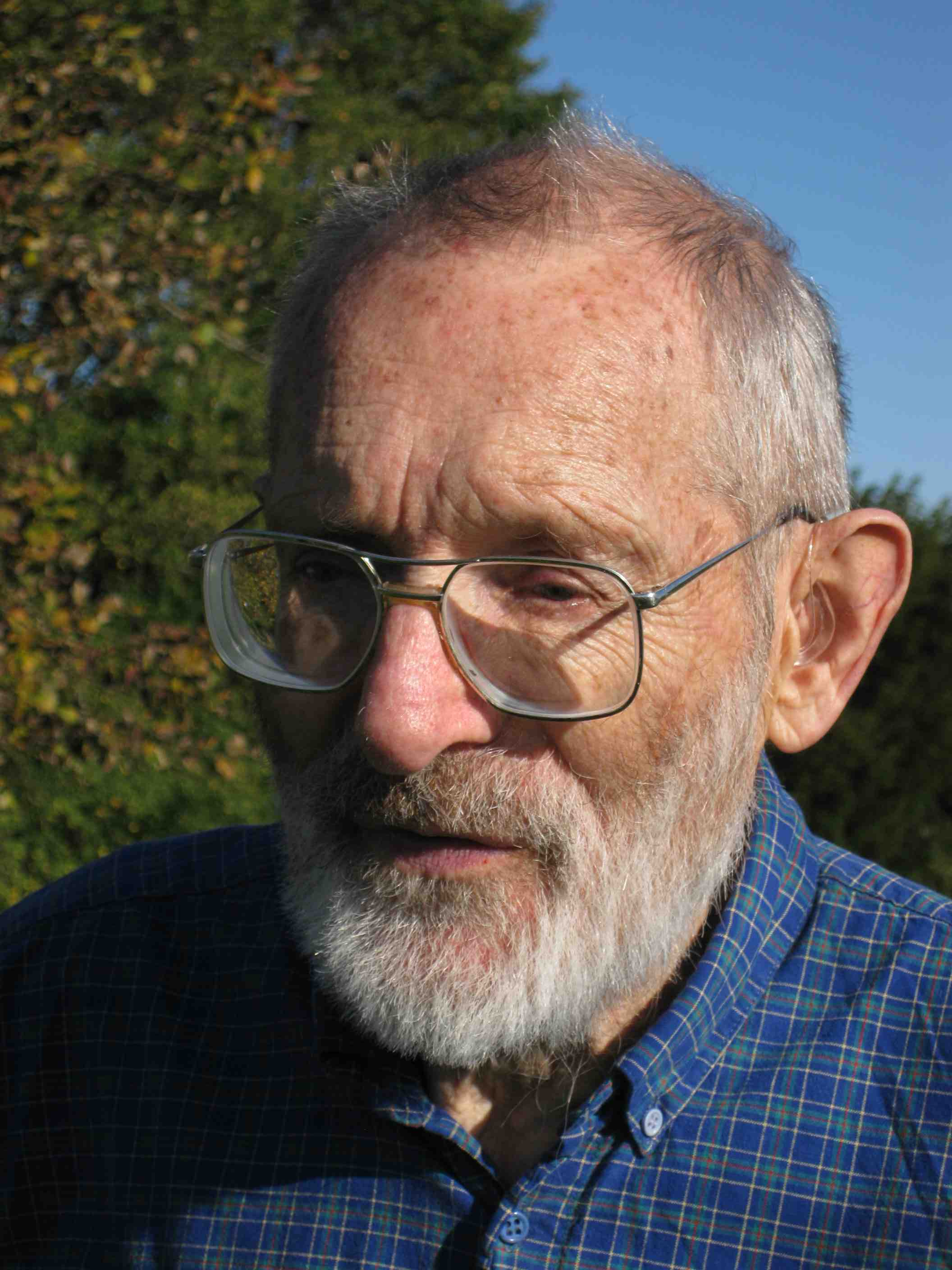
Portrait of Jean Jeener taken at Wavereille, Belgium, in october 2011

Jean Louis Charles Jeener (31 July 1931 – 10 June 2023) was a Belgian physical chemist and physicist, well known for his experimental and theoretical contributions to spin thermodynamics in solids and for his invention of Two-dimensional nuclear magnetic resonance spectroscopy. He was born in Brussels on 31 July 1931, son of biologist Raymond Jeener and Hélène Massar. He was married to Françoise Henin. Jenner died on 10 June 2023, at the age of 91.

== Early life ==
Jeener was born in Brussels on July 31, 1931, to parents with a scientific background; his father, Raymond Jeener, was a biologist, and his mother was Hélène Massar. Jean pursued his academic interests in science at the Université libre de Bruxelles (ULB), where he completed degrees in chemistry and physics in the early 1950s. His academic path included studying under Nobel laureate Ilya Prigogine, known for his work on thermodynamics, and further expanded through a postdoctoral stint with NMR pioneer Nicolaas Bloembergen, who won the Nobel Prize in Physics for laser spectroscopy.

Returning to ULB as a professor in 1960, he embarked on groundbreaking research in spin thermodynamics. His work led to the development of the Jeener-Broekaert sequence, an innovative method to create and observe dipolar order in solids. This formative phase of his career helped establish Jeener as a visionary in the field of NMR, paving the way for his later advancements, including his seminal work on two-dimensional NMR spectroscopy.

== Career ==
Jeener was professor in Physics at Université libre de Bruxelles (ULB) from 1960 until he retired in 1996.

At ULB, Jeener researched spin thermodynamics and spin dynamics in solids. He introduced the “Jeener-Broekaert sequence” for creating observable quantities of dipolar order in solids.

== Nuclear magnetic resonance spectroscopy ==
Jeener is best known for introducing two-dimensional NMR spectroscopy (2DNMR). In a lecture at the AMPERE Summer School in Basko Polje, Yugoslavia, September 1971, he proposed a novel technique, later known as Correlation Spectroscopy (COSY), in which the response of the nuclear spins to two radio frequency pulses is treated by a double Fourier transformation with respect to the delay between the pulses, and the delay after the second pulse. This technique gives detailed information about the molecular links between atoms, inaccessible with previous techniques.

The first experimental demonstration of this technique was carried out by Richard R. Ernst (Nobel prize 1991).

Later, Jeener introduced a variant of 2DNMR, today known as Nuclear Overhauser Effect Spectroscopy (NOESY), that gives detailed information about the spin-lattice relaxation matrix, and about the spatial relation between atoms in complex molecules.

2DNMR and its multi-dimensional extensions reveal so much more information about the chemical and physical environment of the spins that they have since been used in almost all fields of NMR. Among other applications, they enable detailed reconstruction of the 3-dimensional structure of complex biological macro molecules.

== Recognition ==
Jeener is recipient of several distinctions, including the Prix Quinquennal of the Fonds National de la Recherche Scientifique (Prix Dr. A. De Leeuw-Damry-Bourlart), the Prix Ampère, the ISMAR Prize, the Russell Varian Prize, the Otto Stern Prize. He was Doctor Honoris Causa of ETH-Zürich. The Jean Jeener NMR Centre, inaugurated in 2010 at the Vrije Universiteit Brussel, is named after him.

== Selected journal publications ==
- J. Jeener; P. Broekaert (1967). "Nuclear Magnetic Resonance in Solids : Thermodynamic Effects of a Pair of rf Pulses". Phys. Rev. 157 (2): 232–240. Bibcode:1967PhRv..157..232J. doi:10.1103/PhysRev.157.232.
- J. Jeener; B.H. Meier; P. Bachmann; R.R. Ernst (1979). "Investigation of exchange processes by two-dimensional NMR Spectroscopy". J. Chem. Phys. 71 (11): 4546–4553. Bibcode:1979JChPh..71.4546J. doi:10.1063/1.438208.
- J. Jeener; A. Vlassenbroek; P. Broekaert (1995). "Unified Derivation of the Dipolar Field and Relaxation Terms in the Bloch-Redfield Equations of Liquid NMR". J. Chem. Phys. 103 (4): 1309–1332. Bibcode:1995JChPh.103.1309J. doi:10.1063/1.469808.
- J. Jeener; G. Alewaeters (2016). "Pulse pair technique in high resolution NMR a reprint of the historical 1971 lecture notes on two-dimensional spectroscopy". Progress in Nuclear Magnetic Resonance Spectroscopy. 94–95: 75–80. doi:10.1016/j.pnmrs.2016.03.002.

== Bibliography ==
- Jeener, Jean (15 March 2007). "Reminiscences about the Early Days of 2D NMR". Encyclopedia of Magnetic Resonance. John Wiley & Sons, Ltd. doi:10.1002/9780470034590.emrhp0087.
