= Spin echo =

Response of spin to electromagnetic radiation

Animation of spin echo, showing the response of spins (red arrows) in the blue Bloch sphere to the green pulse sequence

In magnetic resonance, a spin echo or Hahn echo is the refocusing of spin magnetisation by a pulse of resonant electromagnetic radiation. Modern nuclear magnetic resonance (NMR) and magnetic resonance imaging (MRI) make use of this effect.

The NMR signal observed following an initial excitation pulse decays with time due to both spin relaxation and any inhomogeneous effects which cause spins in the sample to precess at different rates. The first of these, relaxation, leads to an irreversible loss of magnetisation. But the inhomogeneous dephasing can be removed by applying a 180° inversion pulse that inverts the magnetisation vectors. Examples of inhomogeneous effects include a magnetic field gradient and a distribution of chemical shifts. If the inversion pulse is applied after a period t of dephasing, the inhomogeneous evolution will rephase to form an echo at time 2t. In simple cases, the intensity of the echo relative to the initial signal is given by e^{–2t/T_{2}} where T_{2} is the time constant for spin–spin relaxation. The echo time (TE) is the time between the excitation pulse and the peak of the signal.

Echo phenomena are important features of coherent spectroscopy which have been used in fields other than magnetic resonance including laser spectroscopy and neutron scattering.

== History ==
Echoes were first detected in nuclear magnetic resonance by Erwin Hahn in 1950, and spin echoes are sometimes referred to as Hahn echoes. In nuclear magnetic resonance and magnetic resonance imaging, radiofrequency radiation is most commonly used.

In 1972 Ferenc Mezei introduced spin-echo neutron scattering, a technique that can be used to study magnons and phonons in single crystals. The technique is now applied in research facilities using triple axis spectrometers.

In 2020 two teams demonstrated that when strongly coupling an ensemble of spins to a resonator, the Hahn pulse sequence does not just lead to a single echo, but rather to a whole train of periodic echoes. In this process the first Hahn echo acts back on the spins as a refocusing pulse, leading to self-stimulated secondary echoes.

== Principle ==
The spin-echo effect was discovered by Erwin Hahn when he applied two successive 90° pulses separated by short time period, but detected a signal, the echo, when no pulse was applied. He explained the phenomenon in his 1950 paper,; the topic was further explored by Hermann Carr and Edward Mills Purcell, who pointed out the advantages of using a 180° refocusing pulse for the second pulse. The pulse sequence may be better understood by breaking it down into the following steps:

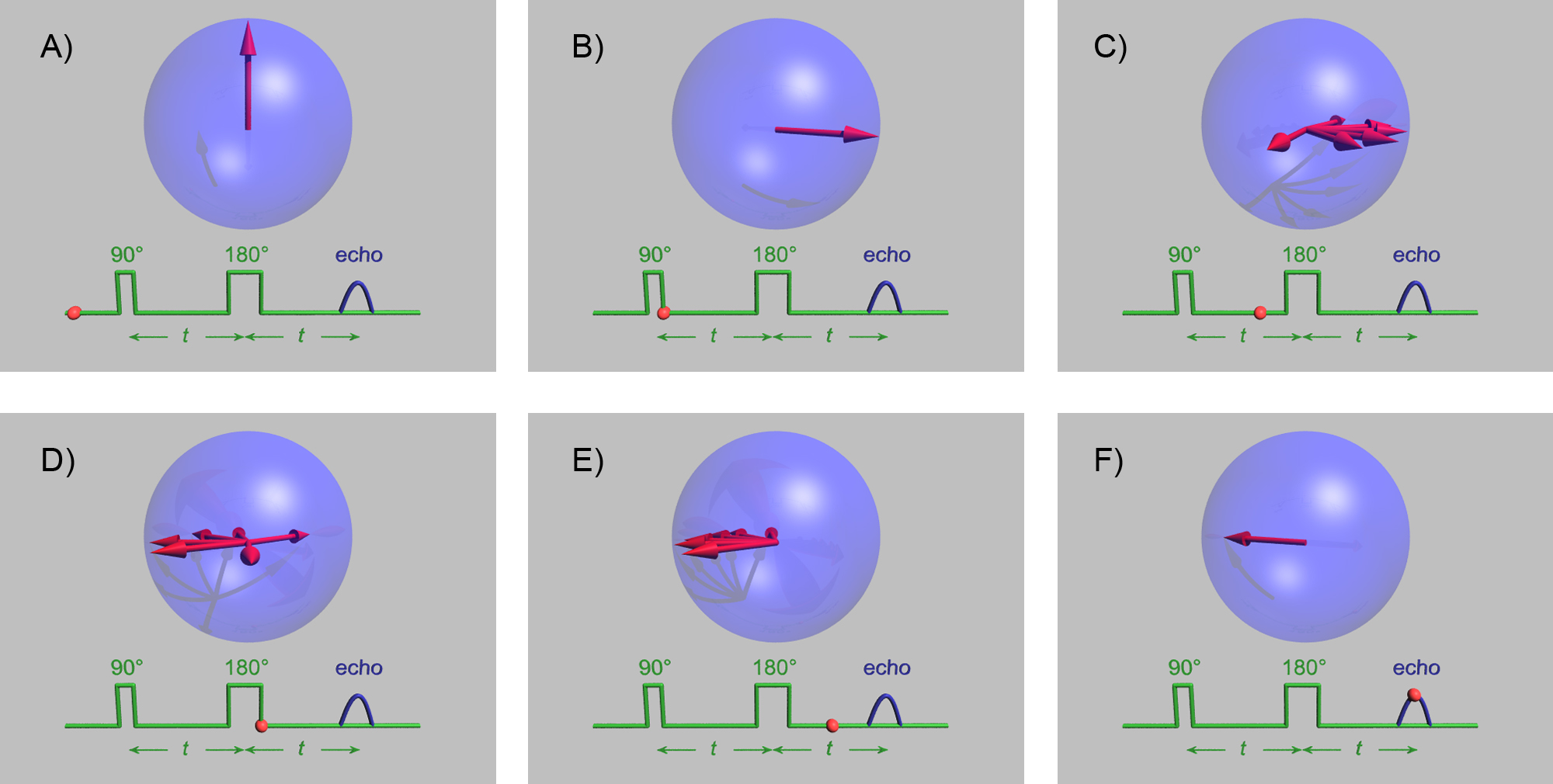
The spin-echo sequence

1. The vertical red arrow is the average magnetic moment of a group of spins, such as protons. All are vertical in the vertical magnetic field and spinning on their long axis, but this illustration is in a rotating reference frame where the spins are stationary on average.
2. A 90° pulse has been applied that flips the arrow into the horizontal (x–y) plane.
3. Due to local magnetic field inhomogeneities (variations in the magnetic field at different parts of the sample that are constant in time), as the net moment precesses, some spins slow down due to lower local field strength (and so begin to progressively trail behind) while some speed up due to higher field strength and start getting ahead of the others. This makes the signal decay.
4. A 180 degree pulse is now applied so that the slower spins lead ahead of the main moment and the fast ones trail behind.
5. Progressively, the fast moments catch up with the main moment and the slow moments drift back toward the main moment. At some moment between E and F the sampling of the echo starts.
6. Complete refocusing has occurred and at this time, an accurate T_{2} echo can be measured with all T_{2}^{*} effects removed. Quite separately, return of the red arrow towards the vertical (not shown) would reflect the T_{1} relaxation. 180 degrees is π radians so 180° pulses are often called π pulses.

Several simplifications are used in this sequence: no decoherence is included and each spin experiences perfect pulses during which the environment provides no spreading. Six spins are shown above and these are not given the chance to dephase significantly. The spin-echo technique is more useful when the spins have dephased more significantly such as in the animation below:

A spin echo with more spins and more dephasing

== Spin-echo decay ==
A Hahn-echo decay experiment can be used to measure the spin–spin relaxation time, as shown in the animation below. The size of the echo is recorded for different spacings of the two pulses. This reveals the decoherence which is not refocused by the π pulse. In simple cases, an exponential decay is measured which is described by the T_{2} time.

== Stimulated echo ==
Hahn's 1950 paper showed that another method for generating spin echoes is to apply three successive 90° pulses. After the first 90° pulse, the magnetization vector spreads out as described above, forming what can be thought of as a "pancake" in the x-y plane. The spreading continues for a time $\tau$, and then a second 90° pulse is applied such that the "pancake" is now in the x-z plane. After a further time $T$ a third pulse is applied and a stimulated echo is observed after waiting for a time $\tau$ after the last pulse.

== Photon echo ==
Hahn echos have also been observed at optical frequencies. For this, resonant light is applied to a material with an inhomogeneously broadened absorption resonance. Instead of using two spin states in a magnetic field, photon echoes use two energy levels that are present in the material even in zero magnetic field.

== Fast spin echo ==
Fast spin echo (RARE, FAISE or FSE), also called turbo spin echo (TSE) is an MRI sequence that results in fast scan times. In this sequence, several 180 refocusing radio-frequency pulses are delivered during each echo time (TR) interval, and the phase-encoding gradient is briefly switched on between echoes. The FSE/TSE pulse sequence superficially resembles a conventional spin-echo (CSE) sequence in that it uses a series of 180º-refocusing pulses after a single 90º-pulse to generate a train of echoes. The FSE/TSE technique, however, changes the phase-encoding gradient for each of these echoes (a conventional multi-echo sequence collects all echoes in a train with the same phase encoding). As a result of changing the phase-encoding gradient between echoes, multiple lines of k-space (i.e., phase-encoding steps) can be acquired within a given repetition time (TR). As multiple phase-encoding lines are acquired during each TR interval, FSE/TSE techniques may significantly reduce imaging time.

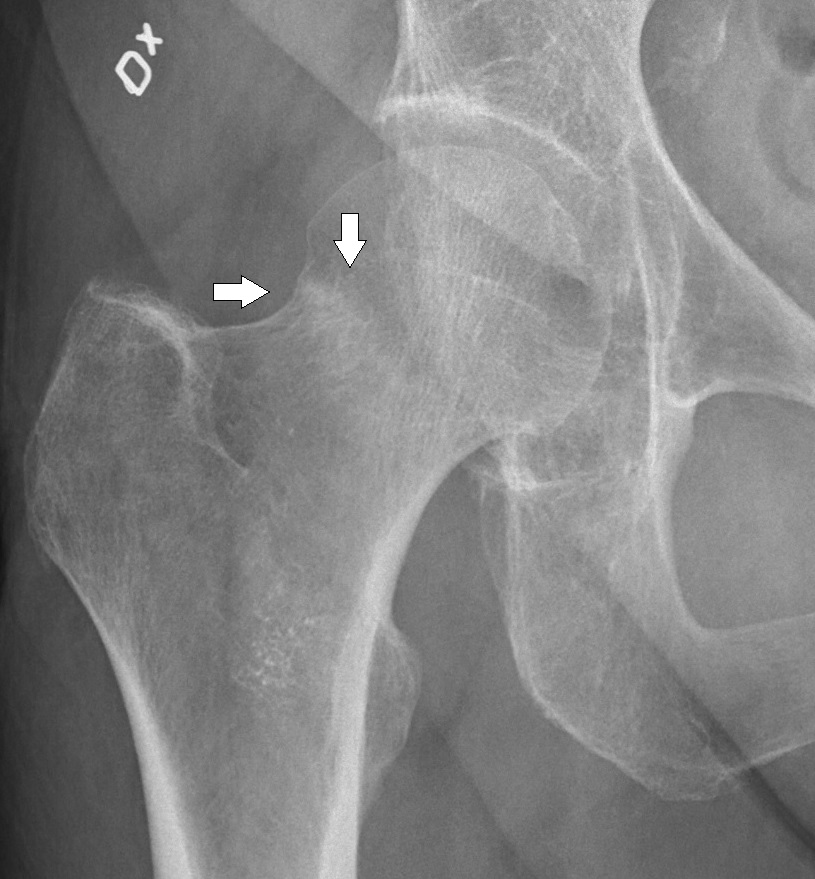
X-ray showing a suspected compressive subcapital fracture as a radiodense line

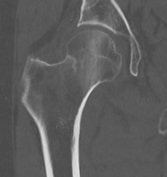
CT scan shows the same, atypical for a fracture since the cortex is coherent

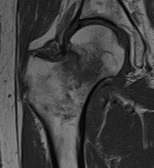
T1-weighted turbo spin echo MRI confirms a fracture, as the surrounding bone marrow has low signal from edema.

== See also ==
- Nuclear magnetic resonance
- Magnetic resonance imaging
- Neutron spin echo
- Electron paramagnetic resonance
- Photon echoes in semiconductor optics
