= Ray Freeman =

British chemist and academic (1932–2022)

- Born: Raymond Freeman; 6 January 1932; Long Eaton, Derbyshire, England
- Died: 1 May 2022 (aged 90); Cambridge, Cambridgeshire, England
- Education: Lincoln College, Oxford
- Spouse: Anne-Marie Périnet-Marquet
- Awards: FRS (1979); Royal Medal (2002)
- Scientific career
- Fields: Chemistry
- Workplaces: University of Cambridge; National Physical Laboratory
- Thesis: Some chemical applications of nuclear magnetic resonance spectra (1958)
- Doctoral advisor: Rex Richards
- Doctoral students: Gareth Morris Geoffrey Bodenhausen Malcolm Levitt
- Website: ch.cam.ac.uk/person/rf110

Raymond Freeman FRS (6 January 1932 – 1 May 2022) was a British chemist and academic, who was a professor at Jesus College, Cambridge and made important contributions to NMR spectroscopy.

== Early life and education ==
Freeman was born in Long Eaton, Derbyshire on 6 January 1932. He was educated at Nottingham High School in Nottingham, England where he won an Open Scholarship to Lincoln College, Oxford in December 1949. At the instigation of Lincoln College, he deferred his admission to Oxford to complete his military service in the Royal Air Force as a radar instructor and reached the rank of acting corporal, un-paid.

In October 1951 he returned to Oxford and began his studies in chemistry under the tutorship of Rex Richards working in research in Rex's group on NMR of the less-common nuclei (in particular ^{59}Co). He earned a Master of Arts and Doctor of Philosophy degrees.

== Career ==
Joining the magnetic resonance group of Anatole Abragam at Saclay, France in 1957, Freeman did postdoctoral research under the direction of an NMR pioneer Robert Pound who was on leave from Harvard University) on the super-regenerative oscillator. Freeman used the device to build a stable high-resolution NMR spectrometer.

=== Varian Associates, California ===
After three years in the Basic Physics division of the National Physical Laboratory, Teddington in the United Kingdom, Freeman took leave of absence in 1961 to work on double irradiation techniques with Wes Anderson at Varian Associates in Palo Alto, California. The environment proved to be very stimulating and a year was extended to twelve. The family lived in California and three of the children are still West Coast residents.

In addition to working on research at Varian on double-resonance, double-quantum effects, spin-lattice relaxation, and Fourier transformation, Freeman assisted in the development of new Varian NMR spectrometers (XL-100 and CFT-20).

=== Back to Oxford ===
In 1973 Freeman returned to Oxford as a university lecturer and a Fellow of Magdalen College beginning his own research group focused on high-resolution NMR methodology. He received a Doctor of Science degree in 1975 and was elected Fellow of the Royal Society in 1979.

With his research students at Oxford, several publications on new NMR techniques were released including work on two-dimensional NMR. Freeman acknowledged that part of the work was triggered by the seminal suggestion of Jean Jeener at a meeting in Brussels.

=== A Handbook of Magnetic Resonance ===
On a short sabbatical at California Institute of Technology (Caltech) in Pasadena, Freeman published "A Handbook of Magnetic Resonance" (translated into Japanese and Russian).

=== Cambridge ===
In 1987 Freeman moved to the University of Cambridge to take up the Plummer chair of magnetic resonance and was elected a Fellow of Jesus College. He continued his research on NMR methodology there and wrote a second book, "Spin Choreography".

Freeman took statutory retirement in 1999, but continued his research with a long-time colleague Eriks Kupce, and wrote his third book, "NMR in Chemistry and Medicine", published in 2003 and later translated into Russian.

== Personal life and death ==
In 1958 Freeman married Anne-Marie Périnet-Marquet (originally from Haute-Savoie, France) and they had five children. He died from bladder cancer at a hospice in Cambridge, on 1 May 2022, aged 90.

== Awards and honours ==
Freeman was elected a Fellow of the Royal Society (FRS) in 1979. His nomination reads:

Dr Freeman has been particularly concerned with the development of High Resolution Nuclear Magnetic Resonance since 1956. Over the years he has initiated very many of the techniques of high resolution Nuclear Magnetic Resonance which are now used routinely all over the world. He was responsible for the exploitation of double and triple resonance techniques for the analysis of high resolution NMR spectra and for the determination of relative signs of spin coupling constants in proton spectra. His two major papers on the theory of double resonance and on the theory of spin tickling form the basis of methods used universally today. He showed how C-13 and other weak resonances could be observed indirectly by double resonance methods and also demonstrated the use of double quantum transitions for the assignment of NMR spectra. He then published a series of elegant papers on spin-spin and spin-lattice relaxation in high resolution spectra, demonstrated some of the earliest uses of Fourier transform spectroscopy, and pioneered the methods of measuring spin-lattice relaxation times of C-13 spectra and their use for structural purposes. Dr Freeman's work is characterised by novelty and ingenuity expressed with economy and style.

Freeman was also awarded the Royal Medal in 2002.
