= Erwin Hahn =

American physicist (1921-2016)

- Born: Erwin Louis Hahn; June 9, 1921; Sharon, Pennsylvania
- Died: September 20, 2016 (aged 95); Berkeley, California
- Education: Juniata College; University of Illinois
- Known for: Hanh echo Cross-polarization
- Awards: Oliver E. Buckley Condensed Matter Prize (1971); Wolf Prize in Physics (1983/4)
- Scientific career
- Fields: Physics
- Workplaces: Stanford University; University of California
- Doctoral students: Sven R. Hartmann

Erwin Louis Hahn (June 9, 1921 – September 20, 2016) was an American physicist, best known for his work on nuclear magnetic resonance (NMR). In 1950 he discovered the spin echo.

== Biography ==
=== Education ===
He grew up in Sewickley, Pennsylvania. He received his B.S. in Physics from Juniata College and his M.S. and Doctor of Philosophy from the University of Illinois at Urbana–Champaign. He served as an enlisted sailor in the United States Navy and was an instructor on radar and sonar.

=== Career and research ===
He was professor of physics, from 1955 to 1991, and subsequently, Professor Emeritus at the University of California, Berkeley.

He died at the age of 95 in 2016.

== Research ==
Hahn discovered experimentally and popularized the concept of spin echo in 1950.

Hahn and his PhD student Sven R. Hartmann developed the cross-polarization technique in 1961.

== Honors and awards ==
Hahn was elected a Fellow of the American Academy of Arts and Sciences in 1971.

In 1993 he was awarded the Comstock Prize in Physics from the National Academy of Sciences. In 2013, Sir Peter Mansfield said in his autobiography that Hahn was "the person who really missed out" the Nobel Prize for his contribution to the principles of spin echoes.

He also received the 2016 Gold Medal from the International Society for Magnetic Resonance in Medicine (ISMRM). The award, ISMRM's highest honor, was given to Hahn for his creation of pulsed magnetic resonance and processes of signal refocusing which are essential to modern day MRI.
