= Robert G. Griffin =

American chemist (born 1942)

Robert Guy Griffin (born 1942) is the Arthur Amos Noyes Professor of Chemistry and the director of the Francis Bitter Magnet Laboratory at the Massachusetts Institute of Technology (MIT). He is known for his work in high resolution, solid-state nuclear magnetic resonance (NMR) spectroscopy, a field where he has contributed many methods and approaches now widely used in applications of magic-angle spinning (MAS). These include developing methods for heteronuclear decoupling and for measuring distances and torsion angles to determine molecular structures. In addition, he developed approaches for high-field dynamic nuclear polarization (DNP), which increases the sensitivity of MAS experiments by one or two orders of magnitude, primarily for the study of biological solids. He also pioneered methods for resolution enhancement via heteronuclear techniques for polarization transfer between nuclei (to enable structure determination of crystallised and aggregated proteins).His group used these methods to determine the initial structure of an amyloid fibril and more recently the structure of Aβ(1-40) and Aβ(1-42) fibrils, two of the primary pathological aggregates associated with Alzheimer's disease.

Griffin's work has been recognized by election to the U. S. National Academy of Sciences. and the American Academy of Arts and Sciences. He received the Günther Laukien Prize for NMR research in 2007, the ISMAR (International Society of Magnetic Resonance ) Prize in 2010, the EB Wilson Award of the American Chemical Society in 2016, the RR Ernst Award in 2017, the Bijvoet Medal of the Bijvoet Center for Biomolecular Research of Utrecht University in 2018, and the Zavoisky Award for High Field EPR and the Bonhoeffer Lecture of the Max Planck Institute in 2024.
