= Robert Forster (disambiguation) =

Robert Forster (1941–2019) was an American actor.

Robert Forster may also refer to:

- Robert Forster (Australian politician) (1818–1880), New South Wales politician
- Robert Forster (musician) (born 1957), Australian musician, member of The Go-Betweens
- Robert Forster (Quaker) (1791–1873), British Quaker
- Robert Henry Forster (archaeologist) (1867–1923), British Archaeologist and author
- Robert J. Forster, professor of physical chemistry
- Robert Förster (born 1978), German cyclist
- Robert Forster (footballer) (born 1909), English footballer, played for Throckley Welfare, Coventry City, Frickley Colliery and Rochdale between 1929 and 1932

== See also ==
- Robert Foster (disambiguation)
