= National Digestive Diseases Information Clearinghouse =

The National Digestive Diseases Information Clearinghouse (NDDIC) is an information dissemination service of the National Institute of Diabetes and Digestive and Kidney Diseases (NIDDK). The NIDDK is part of the National Institutes of Health, which is under the U.S. Department of Health and Human Services.

Established in 1980, the Clearinghouse provides information about digestive diseases to people with digestive disorders and to their families, health care professionals, and the public. The NDDIC answers inquiries, develops and distributes publications, and works closely with professional and patient organizations and Government agencies to coordinate resources about digestive diseases.

Publications produced by the Clearinghouse are carefully reviewed by both NIDDK scientists and outside experts.
