= William Eaton (scientist) =

American biophysicist

William Allen Eaton
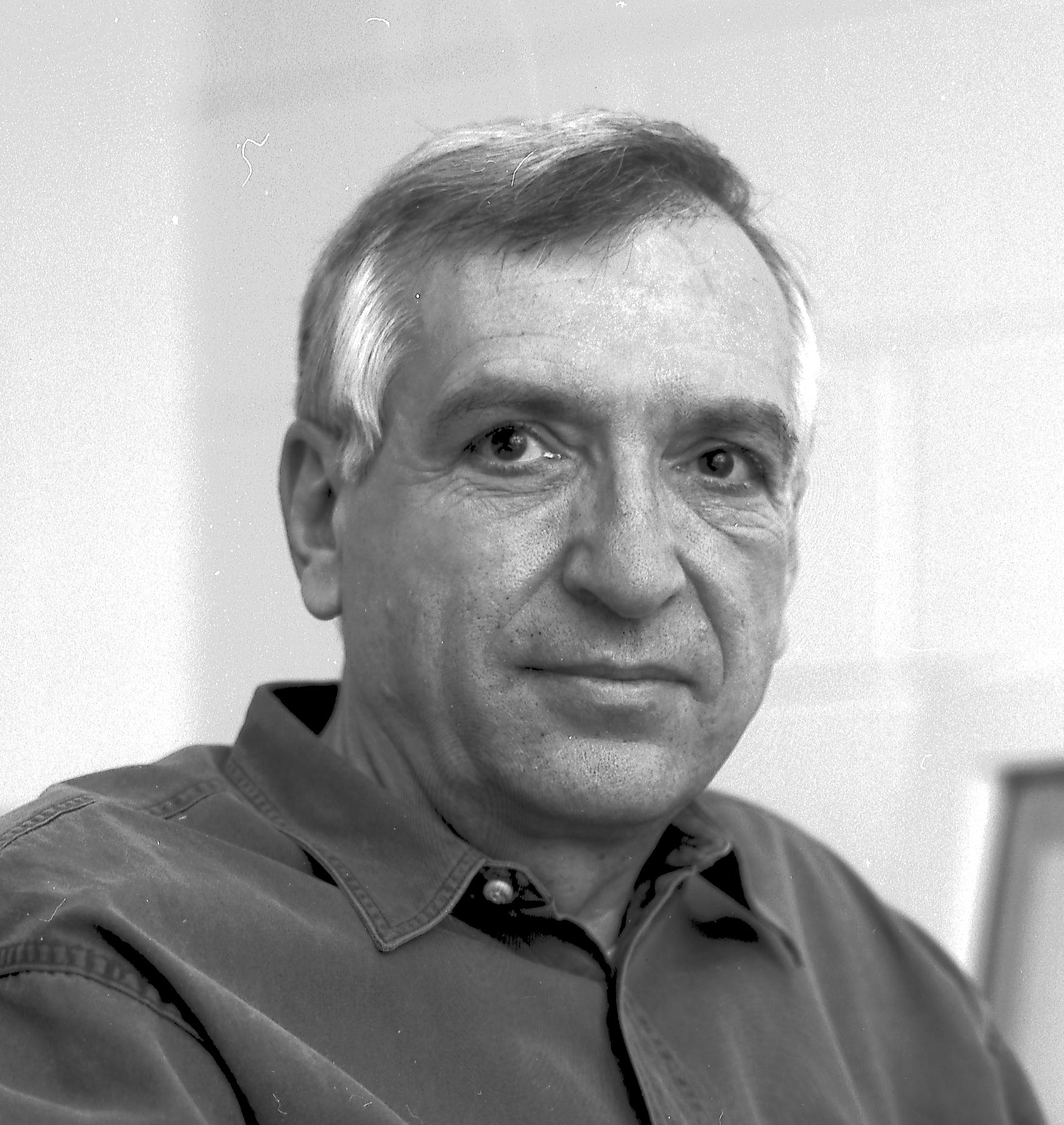
- Born: Philadelphia, Pennsylvania
- Education: University of Pennsylvania
- Scientific career
- Fields: Biophysical Chemistry, Hematology
- Workplaces: National Institute of Diabetes and Digestive and Kidney Diseases
- Doctoral advisor: Robin Hochstrasser

William Allen Eaton is a biophysical chemist who is a NIH Distinguished Investigator, Chief of the Section on Biophysical Chemistry, and Chief of the Laboratory of Chemical Physics at the National Institute of Diabetes and Digestive and Kidney Diseases, one of the 20 Institutes of the United States National Institutes of Health.

== Early life and education ==
Eaton was born and raised in Philadelphia. Like many in his family, he attended the University of Pennsylvania as an undergraduate, majoring in chemistry and graduating in 1959. He then spent one year in Germany as the first Willy Brandt - University of Pennsylvania exchange student at the Free University Berlin. He entered Penn medical school in the Fall of 1960, but discovered that he was more interested in research, particularly after spending the summer of 1962 carrying out research on protein biosynthesis under the supervision of Sydney Brenner at the Laboratory of Molecular Biology, Cambridge, England. He decided to pursue a Ph.D. and became one of Penn's first M.D.-Ph.D. students, working with Robin Hochstrasser on molecular spectroscopy of single crystals of heme proteins. He received his M.D. in 1964 and his Ph.D. in 1967. After finishing his Ph.D. research, he was drafted into the military and chose to fulfill his military obligation as a medical officer in the United States Public Health Service, where he could conduct research at the National Institutes of Health.

== Research career ==
Eaton has spent his entire career at the NIH after arriving as a medical officer in the Public Health Service in January 1968, leaving only once for a significant period of time to teach physical chemistry as a visiting professor at Harvard for the Spring semester of 1976. In 1972, he was tenured in the then-new Laboratory of Chemical Physics and became its chief in 1986. Eaton's early work at NIH built on his work on heme proteins, focusing mainly on hemoglobin and the abnormal aggregation of the mutant form of the protein found in sickle-cell anemia. In the early 1990s, Eaton began to focus on theoretical and experimental studies of protein folding and has been particularly influential in the study of fast-folding proteins and applications of single molecule fluorescence spectroscopy.

In addition to research, Eaton is credited for developing the Laboratory of Chemical Physics within the National Institute of Diabetes and Digestive and Kidney Diseases, NIH into one of the very top biophysics/structural biology departments in the USA. Eaton, as Chief of the Laboratory of Chemical Physics, recruited the legendary theorist, Robert Zwanzig, and scientists such as Ad Bax, Marius Clore FRS, Angela Gronenborn, Attila Szabo, and Robert Tycko all of whom were subsequently elected to the US National Academy of Sciences. As Scientific Director from 1986-2018 of the Intramural AIDS Targeted Anti-viral Program of the Office of the Director, NIH, Eaton directed a program that contributed to the sterling record of NIH scientists in meeting the AIDS crisis, a program that has been a model for new special granting programs within NIH.

== Awards and honors ==
- Elected to the American Academy of Arts and Sciences, 1997
- Fellow of the American Physical Society, 1998
- Elected to the National Academy of Sciences, 2006
- Founders Award, Biophysical Society, 2006
- Hans Neurath Award, Protein Society, 2009
- Humboldt Research Award for Senior Scientists, 2009
- Foreign Fellow, Accademia Nazionale dei Lincei, Rome (2011)
- Max Delbruck Prize in Biological Physics, American Physical Society, 2012
- "Distinguished Graduate Award Winners". University of Pennsylvania.
- "Distinguished Alumni Award". University of Pennsylvania. 2015.
- Doctor rerum naturalium honoris causa, Free University Berlin (2016)
- Laurea Honoris Causa, University of Parma (2018)
- Festschrift, Journal of Physical Chemistry B, December 13, 2018
- 2019 Henry M. Stratton Medal of the American Society of Hematology
- 2022 Peter Debye Award in Physical Chemistry of the American Chemical Society
