= Ahmed Zewail =

Egyptian and American chemist (1946–2016)

Ahmed Hassan Zewail ON OME
- أَحْمَد حَسَن زُوَيْل
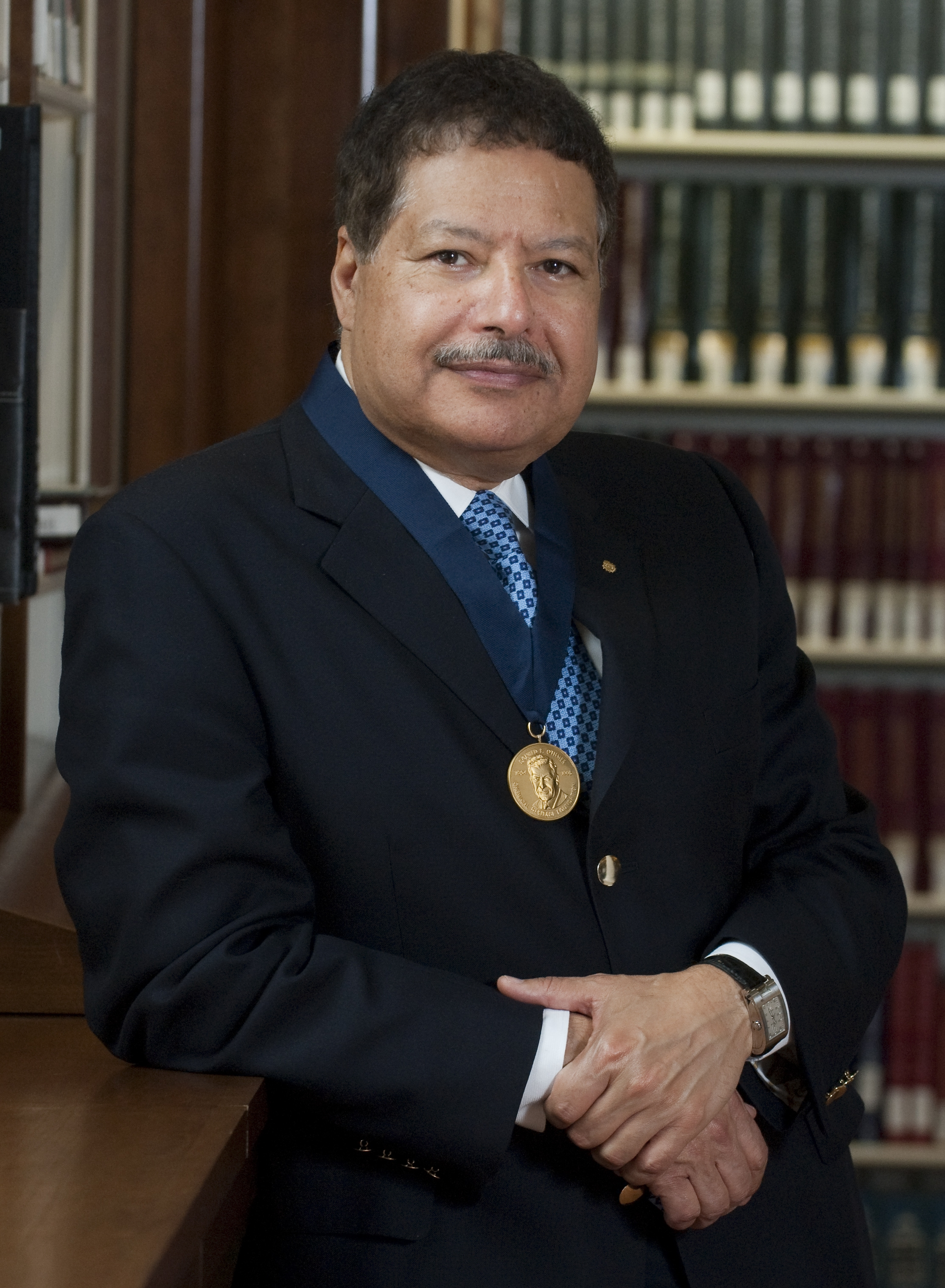
- Zewail in 2010
- Born: Ahmed Hassan Zewail; February 26, 1946; Damanhur, Egypt
- Died: August 2, 2016 (aged 70); Pasadena, California, U.S.
- Resting place: 6th of October, Giza, Egypt
- Citizenship: Egypt; United States (naturalized)
- Education: University of Alexandria (B.S., M.S.); University of Pennsylvania (Ph.D.)
- Known for: Femtochemistry
- Awards: King Faisal International Prize for Science (1989); Wolf Prize in Chemistry (1993); Order of Merit (1995); Peter Debye Award (1996); Tolman Award (1997); E. Bright Wilson Award (1997); E. O. Lawrence Award (1998); The Franklin Medal (United States) (1998); Paul Karrer Gold Medal (1998); Nobel Prize for Chemistry (1999); Order of the Nile (1999); ForMemRS (2001); Albert Einstein World Award of Science (2006); Othmer Gold Medal (2009); Priestley Medal (2011); Davy Medal (2011)
- Scientific career
- Fields: Femtochemistry
- Workplaces: University of California, Berkeley; California Institute of Technology; Zewail City of Science, Technology and Innovation; Tohoku University
- Thesis: Optical and magnetic resonance spectra of triplet excitons and localized states in molecular crystals (1975)
- Doctoral advisor: Robin M. Hochstrasser

Ahmed Hassan Zewail (Note: (Arabic: أَحْمَد حَسَن زُوَيْل)) (February 26, 1946 – August 2, 2016) was an Egyptian-American chemist, known as the "Father of Femtochemistry". He was awarded the 1999 Nobel Prize in Chemistry for his work on femtochemistry and became the first Egyptian and Arab to win a Nobel Prize in a scientific field, and the first African to win a Nobel Prize in Chemistry. He was a professor of chemistry and physics at the California Institute of Technology (Caltech), where he was the first Caltech faculty member to be named the Linus Pauling Chair of Chemical Physics and was the director of the Physical Biology Center for Ultrafast Science and Technology.

== Early life and education ==
Ahmed Hassan Zewail was born on February 26, 1946, in Damanhur, Egypt, and was raised in Desouk. He received bachelor's and master's degrees in chemistry from Alexandria University before moving to the United States to complete his PhD at the University of Pennsylvania under the supervision of Robin M. Hochstrasser.

== Career ==
After completing his PhD, Zewail did postdoctoral research at the University of California, Berkeley, supervised by Charles B. Harris. Following this, he was awarded a faculty appointment at the California Institute of Technology in 1976, and eventually became the first Linus Pauling Chair in Chemical Physics there. He became a naturalized citizen of the United States on March 5, 1982. Zewail was the director of the Physical Biology Center for Ultrafast Science and Technology at the California Institute of Technology.

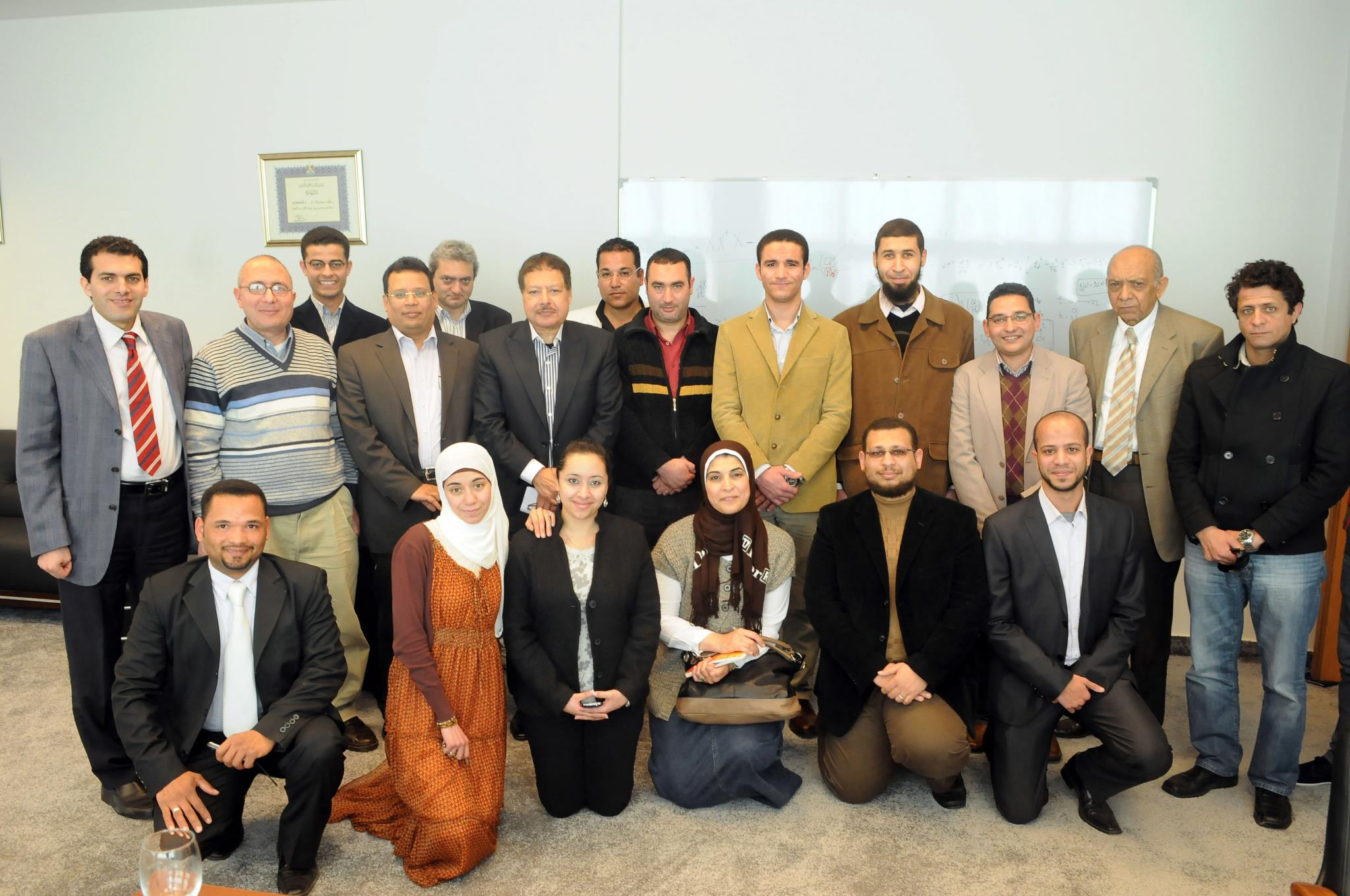
Zewail with his colleagues at the Zewail City of Science, Technology and Innovation in 2012

Zewail was nominated and participated in President Barack Obama's Presidential Council of Advisors on Science and Technology (PCAST), an advisory group of the nation's leading scientists and engineers to advise the President and Vice President and formulate policy in the areas of science, technology, and innovation.

== Research ==
Zewail's key work was a pioneer of femtochemistry—i.e. the study of chemical reactions on a femtosecond timescale. Using a rapid ultrafast laser technique (consisting of ultrashort laser flashes), the technique allows the description of reactions on very short time scales – short enough to analyse transition states in selected chemical reactions.

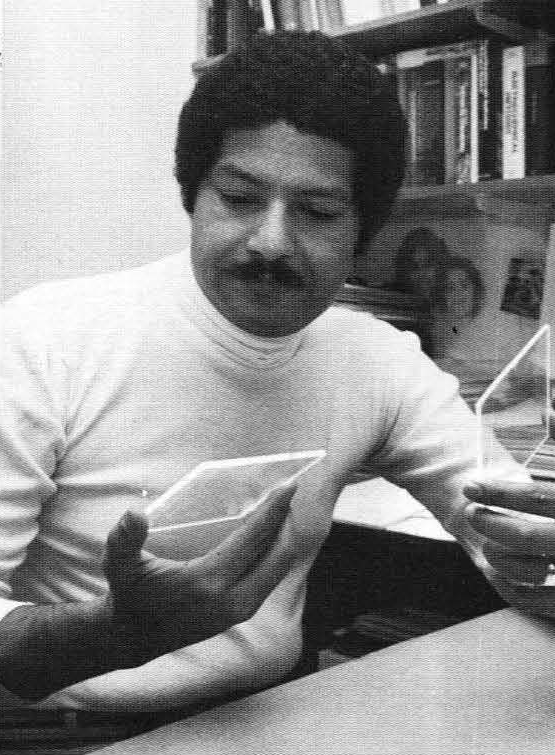
Zewail in 1986

Zewail became known as the "father of femtochemistry". He also made critical contributions in ultrafast electron diffraction, which uses short electron pulses rather than light pulses to study chemical reaction dynamics.

== Political work ==
In a speech at Cairo University on June 4, 2009, US President Barack Obama proclaimed a new Science Envoy program as part of a "new beginning between the United States and Muslims around the world." In January 2010, Ahmed Zewail, Elias Zerhouni, and Bruce Alberts became the first US science envoys to the Muslim world, visiting Muslim-majority countries from North Africa to Southeast Asia.

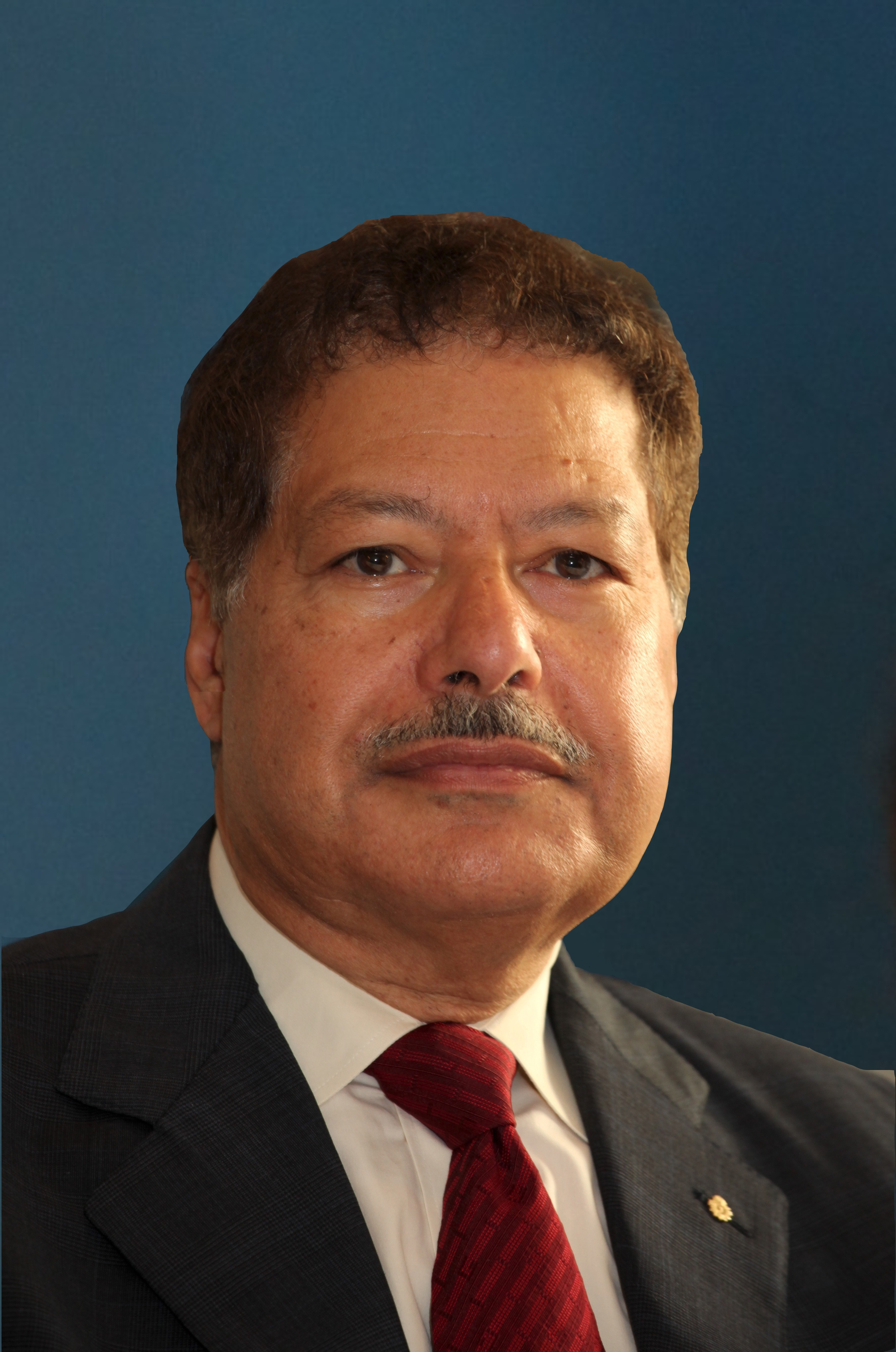
Zewail in 2010

When asked about rumors that he might contest the 2012 Egyptian presidential election, Ahmed Zewail said: "I am a frank man... I have no political ambition, as I have stressed repeatedly that I only want to serve Egypt in the field of science and die as a scientist."

During the 2011 Egyptian protests he announced his return to the country. Zewail said that he would join a committee for constitutional reform alongside Ayman Nour, Mubarak's rival at the 2005 presidential elections and a leading lawyer. Zewail was later mentioned as a respected figure working as an intermediary between the military regime ruling after Mubarak's resignation, and revolutionary youth groups such as the April 6 Youth Movement and young supporters of Mohamed ElBaradei. He played a critical role during this time as described by Egyptian media.

== Awards and honours ==
Zewail's work brought him international attention, receiving awards and honors throughout most of his career for his work in chemistry and physics. In 1999, Zewail became the first Egyptian to receive a science Nobel Prize when he was awarded the Nobel Prize in Chemistry. Zewail gave his Nobel Lecture on "Femtochemistry: Atomic-Scale Dynamics of the Chemical Bond Using Ultrafast Lasers".

In 1999, he received Egypt's highest state honour, the Grand Collar of the Nile. Other notable awards include the Alexander von Humboldt Senior Scientist Award (1983), the King Faisal International Prize (1989), the Wolf Prize in Chemistry (1993), the Earle K. Plyler Prize (1993), the Herbert P. Broida Prize (1995), the Peter Debye Award (1996), the Tolman Award (1997), the Robert A. Welch Award (1997), the Linus Pauling Medal (1997), the Franklin Medal (1998) and the Golden Plate Award of the American Academy of Achievement (2000). In October 2006, Zewail received the Albert Einstein World Award of Science for "his pioneering development of the new field of femtoscience and for his seminal contributions to the revolutionary discipline of physical biology, creating new ways for better understanding the functional behavior of biological systems by directly visualizing them in the four dimensions of space and time." Zewail was awarded the Othmer Gold Medal (2009), the Priestley Medal (2011) from the American Chemical Society and the Davy Medal (2011) from the Royal Society.

In 1982 he was named as a Fellow of the American Physical Society. Zewail became a member of the National Academy of Sciences in 1989, the American Academy of Arts and Sciences in 1993, and the American Philosophical Society in 1998. Zewail was elected a Foreign Member of the Royal Society (ForMemRS) in 2001. He was also elected as a Fellow of the African Academy of Sciences in 2001.

Zewail was made a Foreign Member of the Royal Swedish Academy of Sciences. In 2005, the Ahmed Zewail Award for Ultrafast Science and Technology was established by the American Chemical Society and the Newport Corporation in his honor. In 2010 the journal Chemical Physics Letters established the Ahmed Zewail Prize in Molecular Sciences. In May 2010, Zewail gave the commencement address at Southwestern University. The Zewail City of Science and Technology, established in 2000 and revived in 2011, is named in his honour.

=== Honorary degrees ===
Zewail was bestowed honorary degrees by the following institutions: University of Oxford, UK (1991); The American University in Cairo, Egypt (1993); Katholieke Universiteit, Leuven, Belgium (1997); University of Pennsylvania, US (1997); University of Lausanne, Switzerland (1997); Swinburne University of Technology, Australia (1999); Arab Academy for Science, Technology & Maritime Transport, Egypt (1999); D.Sc. Alexandria University, Egypt (1999); D.Sc. University of New Brunswick, Canada (2000); Sapienza University of Rome, Italy (2000); University of Liège, Belgium (2000); Heriot-Watt University, Scotland (2002); Lund University, Sweden (2003); Cambridge University (2006); Complutense University of Madrid, Spain (2008); University of Jordan, Jordan (2009); University of Glasgow, Scotland (2011); Yale University, US (2014).

=== Egyptian national honours ===
Egypt

- Grand Cross of the Order of Merit (Egypt) (1995)
- Grand Cordon of the Order of the Arab Republic of Egypt (1998)
- Grand Collar of the Order of the Nile (1999)

=== Foreign honours ===
France

- Knight of the Legion of Honour
- Officier of the National Order of Merit

Lebanon

- Grand Cordon of the National Order of the Cedar

Sudan

- Grand Officer of the Order of the Two Niles

Tunisia

- Commander of the Order of the Republic

United Arab Emirates

- Grand Officer of Order of Zayed

== Personal life ==
Zewail and his first wife, Mervat, were married in 1967, just before leaving Egypt to attend the University of Pennsylvania for his PhD. He had two daughters with Mervat, Maha and Amani. Mervat and Ahmed however, separated in 1979.

Zewail married Dema Faham, a Syrian, in 1989. Zewail and Faham had two sons, Nabeel and Hani.

== Death and funeral ==
Zewail died aged 70 on the morning of August 2, 2016. He was recovering from cancer, however, the exact cause of his death is unknown. Zewail returned to Egypt, but only his body was received at Cairo Airport. A military funeral was held for Zewail on August 7, 2016, at the El-Mosheer Tantawy mosque in Cairo, Egypt. Those attending included President Abdel Fattah el-Sisi, Prime Minister Sherif Ismail, al-Azhar Grand Imam Ahmed el-Tayeb, Defence Minister Sedki Sobhi, former President Adly Mansour, former Prime Minister Ibrahim Mahlab and heart surgeon Magdi Yacoub. The funeral prayers were led by Ali Gomaa, former Grand Mufti of Egypt.

== Publications ==
=== Scientific ===
- Advances in Laser Spectroscopy I, ed. A. H. Zewail, SPIE, Bellingham, 1977
- Advances in Laser Chemistry, ed. A. H. Zewail, Springer-Verlag, Berlin-Heidelberg, 1978
- Photochemistry and Photobiology, Vols. 1 and 2, ed. A. H. Zewail, Harwood Academic, London, 1983
- Ultrafast Phenomena VII, eds. C. B. Harris, E. P. Ippen, G. A. Mourou and A. H. Zewail, Springer-Verlag, Berlin-Heidelberg, 1990
- The Chemical Bond: Structure and Dynamics, ed. A. H. Zewail, Academic Press, Boston, 1992
- Ultrafast Phenomena VIII, eds. J.-L. Martin, A. Migus, G. A. Mourou, and A. H. Zewail, Springer-Verlag, Berlin-Heidelberg, 1993
- Ultrafast Phenomena IX, eds. P. F. Barbara, W. H. Knox, G. A. Mourou, and A. H. Zewail, Springer-Verlag, Berlin-Heidelberg, 1994
- Femtochemistry: Ultrafast Dynamics of the Chemical Bond Vol. I, A. H. Zewail, World Scientific, 1994
- Femtochemistry: Ultrafast Dynamics of the Chemical Bond Vol. II, A. H. Zewail, World Scientific, 1994
- Physical Biology: From Atoms to Medicine, ed. A. H. Zewail, Imperial College Press, London, 2008
- 4D Electron Microscopy, ed. A. H. Zewail, Imperial College Press, London, 2009
- International Advisory Board for Encyclopedia of Analytical Chemistry (1999–2014)
- 4D Visualization of Matter: Recent Collected Works of Ahmed H Zewail, Nobel Laureate, Imperial College Press, London, 2014

=== Biographical ===
- Voyage Through Time: Walks of Life to the Nobel Prize, Ahmed H Zewail, World Scientific, 2002
- Age of Science (2005, autobiography in Arabic)

=== Remembering Ahmed H. Zewail ===
- Chergui, Majed; Marcus, Rudolph A.; Thomas, John Meurig; Zhong, Dongping (2017). Majed Chergui; Rudolph A Marcus; John Meurig Thomas; Dongping Zhong (eds.). Personal and Scientific Reminiscences: Tributes to Ahmed Zewail. World Scientific. doi:10.1142/q0128. ISBN 978-1-78634-435-9.
- Douhal, Abderrazzak; Baskin, John Spencer; Zhong, Dongping (2017). Abderrazzak Douhal; John Spencer Baskin; Dongping Zhong (eds.). Reminiscences of Ahmed H. Zewail: Photons, Electrons and What Else? A Portrait from Close Range. Remembrances of his Group Members and Family. World Scientific. doi:10.1142/10750. ISBN 978-981-323-153-5.

== See also ==
- Zewail City of Science and Technology (ZCST)
  - Ahmed founded ZCST and even donated his entire Nobel prize money in order to establish this university. Due to his need of wanting help Egypt to excel and advance academically the first batch of students were exempted from fees due to their scientific brilliance.
- List of Egyptian scientists
