= Mizuuchi =

Mizuuchi (written: 水内) is a Japanese surname. Notable people with the surname include:

- Kiyomitsu Mizuuchi (水内 清光, born 1960), Japanese voice actor
- Kiyoshi Mizuuchi (水内 潔), Japanese biochemist
- Takeshi Mizuuchi (水内 猛, born 1972), Japanese footballer
