= Robert J. Forster =

Irish chemist and academic

Robert J. Forster is a professor of Physical Chemistry at Dublin City University. He is a member of the Royal Irish Academy.

== Work ==
Forster has authored many research papers in leading international journals in chemistry. His research has focused on attempts to create new materials with useful electronic or photonic properties, to create new experimental techniques to discover chemical reactivity under extreme conditions and at short timescales and to find theoretical insights into factors influencing electron transfer. His work has implications for a wide variety of areas which include the following: corrosion, biological membranes, the emerging area of molecule-based electronics and heterogeneous catalysis.

== Published works ==
In addition to many published articles Forster was joint author of the book:

- Interfacial Supramolecular Assemblies : Electrochemical and Photophysical Properties, Wiley, 2003. (This book is jointly authored with Johannes G. Vos, Tia E. Keyes)

And joint author of the following book chapters

- Robert Forster, Paolo Bertoncello & T.E. Keyes. 2008. Electrochemiluminescence ACS,. Advances in Analytical Chemistry,
- Robert J. Forster, Tia E. Keyes. 2006. Ultramicroelectrodes. Handbook of Electrochemistry, pp155–186.
- Tia E Keyes and Robert J Forster. 2006. Spectroelectrochemistry. Handbook of Electrochemistry, pp591–633.
- Forster, R. J. and Keyes, T. E. 2001. Ion Selective Electrode for Environmental Analysis. Encyclopedia of Analytical Chemistry
