= Endocrine and Metabolic Diseases Information Service =

The Endocrine and Metabolic Diseases Information Service is an information dissemination service of the National Institute of Diabetes and Digestive and Kidney Diseases (NIDDK). The NIDDK is part of the National Institutes of Health, which is part of the U.S. Department of Health and Human Services.

The Endocrine and Metabolic Diseases Information Service is a part of the NIDDK's Division of Diabetes, Endocrinology, and Metabolic Diseases.
