= Klaas Wynne =

Chemist

- Klaas Wijnne
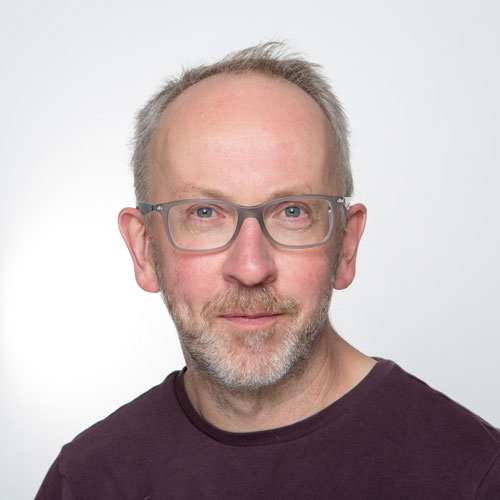
- Born: August 5, 1964 (age 62); Amsterdam, The Netherlands
- Education: University of Amsterdam
- Spouse: Margaret Mitchell (photographer)
- Scientific career
- Fields: Chemistry, physics, spectroscopy
- Academic advisors: Robin M. Hochstrasser
- Website: https://www.wijnne.com

Klaas Wynne (also Wijnne; born 1964) is a professor in the School of Chemistry at the University of Glasgow and chair of Chemical Physics. He was previously a professor in the Department of Physics at the University of Strathclyde (1996–2010).

== Education ==
He received his BSc in chemistry from the University of Amsterdam in 1987 and his PhD in chemistry from the University of Amsterdam in 1990 under the supervision of Joop van Voorst. He did his postdoctoral fellowship in the laboratory of Robin Hochstrasser at the University of Pennsylvania.

== Research ==
Wynne has authored over 90 published scientific papers. His work is focused on the structure and dynamics of liquids and solutions as well as peptides, proteins, and other biomolecules treated as amorphous objects behaving much like liquids. He described the Mayonnaise Effect, which explains the anomalous increase of the viscosity of solutions with concentration in terms of a jamming transition. He is particularly interested in phase behaviour such as supercooling of liquids, folding transitions in peptides, phase separation and nucleation using laser-tweezing, nucleation of crystals from solution", liquid-liquid and liquid-crystalline transitions, and the glass transition. These phenomena are studied using femtosecond spectroscopies such as ultrafast optical Kerr-effect spectroscopy, time-domain terahertz spectroscopy (THz-TDS) as well as optical microscopy and various other forms of spectroscopy. He has pioneered the use of mid-infrared spectroscopy combined with machine learning to identify mosquito age and species.

== Awards and honours ==
- European Research Council Advanced Grant, 2018.
- Chemical Dynamics Award of the Royal Society of Chemistry (RSC), 2018.
- Associate Editor Journal of the American Chemical Society (JACS), 2017–2020.
- Elected Fellow of the Royal Society of Edinburgh (FRSE), 2015.
- Member of Faraday Division Council, 2013–2016.
- Member of the editorial advisory board of the Journal of Physical Chemistry, 2012–2015.
- Visiting professor in the Department of Chemical and Process Engineering, University of Strathclyde, 2012–2014.
- Member of the board of Chemical Physics (Elsevier), 2012-
- Fellow of the Royal Society of Chemistry, 2006.
- Fellow of the Institute of Physics, 2005.
- NATO research fellowship, 1991.
