= Griffin P. Rodgers =

American hematologist

Griffin Rodgers
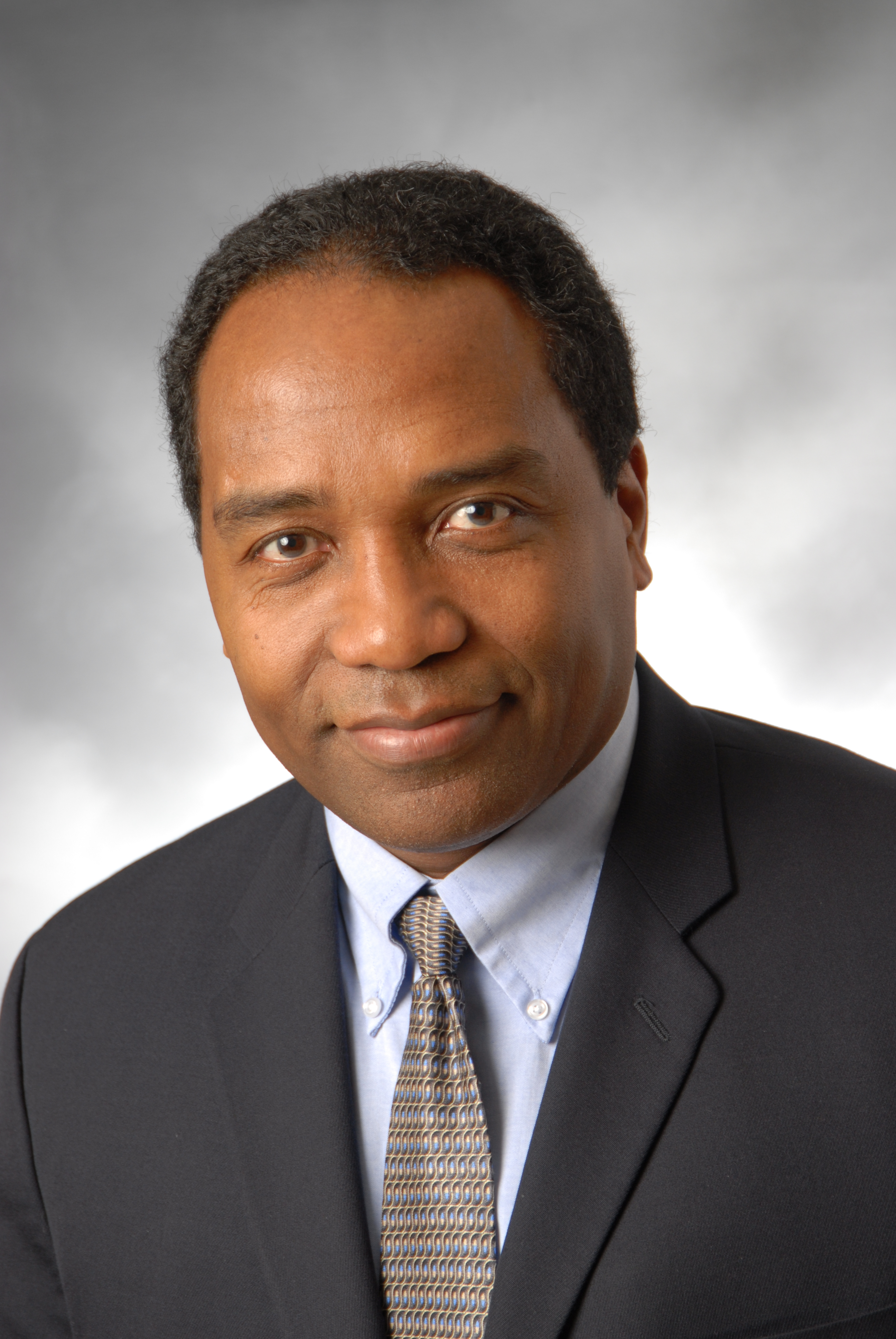
- Education: Brown University (BS, MS, MD); Johns Hopkins University (MBA)
- Known for: Research on sickle cell anemia
- Awards: Mastership from the American College of Physicians (2005)
- Scientific career
- Workplaces: National Institutes of Health; National Institute of Diabetes and Digestive and Kidney Diseases

Griffin P. Rodgers is the director of the National Institute of Diabetes and Digestive and Kidney Diseases, one of the 27 institutes that make up the United States National Institutes of Health. He is also the Chief of the institute's Molecular and Clinical Hematology Branch and is known for contributions to research and therapy for sickle cell anemia.

== Education ==
Rodgers graduated from Brown University for his undergraduate (1976), graduate (1979), and medical degrees (1979), and holds an MBA from Johns Hopkins Carey Business School (2005). He is a hematologist who has been board-certified in internal medicine, emergency medicine, and hematology.

== NIH career ==
Rodgers first joined the NIH in 1984. He became the Chief of the Molecular and Clinical Hematology Branch in 1998 and the NIDDK Deputy Director in 2001. In 2006, he assumed the directorship on an acting basis and this position was made permanent in 2007 by the NIH's director at the time, Elias Zerhouni.

== Research ==
Rodgers is a physician-scientist who studies diseases of bone marrow and is best known for his work on the molecular genetics of hemoglobinopathies and on developing a treatment for sickle cell anemia. He was a major contributor to the development of hydroxyurea therapy, which was approved by the FDA in 1998.

A 2009 study, published under the mentorship of Griffin P. Rodgers, discovered that in human erythrocytes (peripheral blood CD34+ cells), the stem cell factor (SCF) induces γ-globin gene expression by regulating downstream transcription factor COUP-TFII, which can be a crucial molecular mechanism that has the potential for the development of effective pharmacologic strategies for treatment of patients with sickle cell disease or other β-hemoglobinopathies. However, a 2015 study by a group from University of Michigan (Ann Arbor), was unable to replicate, and hence contradicted, the 2009 study. The 2015 study concludes that "we were unable to provide evidence for COUP-TFII expression under any in vivo or in vitro culture condition from human or mouse adult erythroid cells, confirming previous microarray, as well as RNA-seq studies."

== Awards and memberships ==
Rodgers was awarded a Mastership from the American College of Physicians in 2005. He received an honorary Doctor of Science degree from Washington University in St. Louis in 2011.
