= Tia Keyes =

Irish chemist

Tia Emmetine Keyes
- Scientific career
- Fields: Photochemistry, molecular spectroscopy
- Thesis: The Synthesis, electrochemical, spectroscopic, and photophysica characterisation of ruthenium (II) polypridyl complexes containing quinone/hydroquinone moieties (1994)
- Doctoral advisor: Johannes G. Vos

Tia Emmetine Keyes is a professor of physical chemistry at the School of Chemical Sciences, and a member of the National Centre for Sensor Research at Dublin City University.

== Research ==
Keyes specialises in photochemistry and molecular spectroscopy. Among her interests are molecular spectroscopy, supramolecular and interfacial chemistry, photophysics and applications in biology such as cell imaging and sensing, and membrane mimetics.

Keyes completed her PhD in 1994, titled The Synthesis, electrochemical, spectroscopic, and photophysica characterisation of ruthenium (II) polypridyl complexes containing quinone/hydroquinone moieties, supervised by Johannes G. Vos. She studied at Dublin City University.

In 2020, Keyes contributed research to Dublin City University's COVID-19 Research and Innovation Hub. Her project models cell membranes including the ACE2 receptor. This could be used to model the initial viral-host recognition step and may identify other components of the cell membrane that create infection. The aim is to build a platform to test therapeutics to inhibit SARS-CoV-2-ACE2 binding.

== Career ==
She joined the School of Chemical Sciences, at Dublin City University in 2002. She is a member of the National Centre for Sensor Research at Dublin City University, the SFI CSET funded Biomedical Diagnostics Institute and holds a Marie Curie Fellowship from the Royal College of Surgeons of Ireland. In addition to her journal publications she has jointly authored a book (with two of her colleagues from DCU: Johannes G. Vos, Robert J. Forster) Interfacial Supramolecular Assemblies : Electrochemical and Photophysical Properties, Wiley, 2003.

=== Awards and honours ===
Keyes is a Fellow of the Royal Society of Chemistry and a Fellow of the Institute of Chemistry of Ireland.
