= Johannes G. Vos =

Irish chemist

Johannes Gerardus Vos (born 1949), also known as Han Vos, is Emeritus Professor of Inorganic Chemistry at Dublin City University in Ireland.

His early work was on the synthesis, characterisation and physical properties of mononuclear and oligonuclear ruthenium and osmium containing polypyridyl compounds. His later work on the synthesis, characterisation and physical properties of polymer bound metal compounds.

In 1999 he was elected as a Member of the Royal Irish Academy and has been Chairman of the National Committee for Chemistry of the Royal Irish Academy since 2000.

== Published works ==
In addition to many published articles Vos was joint author of :

- Interfacial Supramolecular Assemblies : Electrochemical and Photophysical Properties, Wiley, 2003. (This book is jointly authored with Robert J. Forster, Tia E. Keyes)
