= Age of Science =

2005 Book by Ahmed H. Zewail

- Author: Ahmed Zewail
- Language: Arabic
- Subject: Religion, Islam, Science, Middle East, Egypt, Biography, Autobiography
- Publisher: Shorouk House for Publishing and Distribution
- Publication date: 2005
- Publication place: Egypt
- Media type: Hardcover
- Pages: 259

Age of Science (2005) is a book about science in the 20th century by author and Egyptian-American scientist, and the winner of the 1999 Nobel Prize in Chemistry Ahmed Zewail. The book is also a biography and autobiography about Ahmed Zewail.
