= Bob Foster =

Bob Foster may refer to:

- Bob Foster (American football, born 1886) (1886–1947), American football player
- Bob Foster (horticulturist) (1938–2002), American horticulturist and businessman
- Bob Foster (American football, born 1941), American football coach
- Bob Foster (boxer) (1942–2015), American boxer
- Bob Foster (footballer) (1911–1983), English football goalkeeper
- Bob Foster (motorcyclist) (1911–1982), British motorcycle racer
- Bob Foster (politician) (1947–2025), former mayor of Long Beach, California

== See also ==
- Robert Foster (disambiguation)
