= William A. Hagins =

American medical researcher

William Archer Hagins
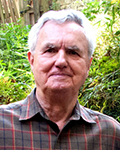
- Died: June 6, 2012
- Scientific career
- Fields: The transduction of electrical signal in photorecepters in retinal

William Archer Hagins (died June 6, 2012) was an American medical researcher. He was chief of the Section of Membrane Biophysics in National Institute of Diabetes and Digestive and Kidney Diseases's Laboratory of Chemical Physics upon his retirement in 2007. Hagins and colleagues made the seminal discovery of the dark current in photoreceptor cells. This finding became central to understanding how the visual cells worked and led to knowledge of the importance of reattaching a detached retina as soon as possible for continued use. As a fellow of Fulbright Program, he'd also served in the United States Navy as a Research Medical Officer. He joined NIDDK's Laboratory of Physical Biology in 1958, doing independent research in the Section of Photobiology, headed by Frederick Sumner Brackett. Hagins was a mentor to many, particularly through his work with the Brackett Foundation.

== Education ==
William A. Hagins was a native Washingtonian, Chevy Chase resident. In Stanford University California, he got a bachelor's degree in biology, and continued to get a master's degree in anatomy in 1948. In 1951, he graduated from School of Medical in Stanford University. With a Fulbright fellowship, he studied at the physiology laboratory in University of Cambridge, England. In 1958, he received his doctorate.

== Career ==
William A. Hagins joined NIDDK's Laboratory of Physical Biology in 1958. He was elected to the National Academy of Sciences and was a past president of the Biophysical Society. He was involved in various professional journals as an editor or editorial board member. He was a mentor to graduate students and postdoctoral physicians. In the 1960s, Hagins and his group showed how the eye transforms images in the retina to produce the sensation of vision.

== Research interests ==
Hagins as an graduate student in Stanford University worked on the project about the influence of diameter on the characteristics of the action potential of single nerve fibers. At the physiology laboratory in University of Cambridge, Hagins focused on the phototransduction of rhodopsin, especially the photosensitivity, the photobleaching and flash photolysis.

After joining Laboratory of Physical Biology, Hagins went deep into this field and made more efforts on studying the photoelectric effects of functional photoreceptors in retina, especially squid retina. With enormous efforts on the photoelectric effects in retinal, Hagins and colleagues found the dark current in retinal rods. Hagins with his group did a series of research to explore the cell biological mechanisms of rods and cones at molecular level.

Hagins also did some works on optics and microscopy.

== Selected publications ==
- Membrane origin of the fast photovoltage of squid retina – A small region within the outer segments of squid photoreceptors can generate a locally flowing membrane current after an illuminated excitation, whose spreading along the outer segments leads to the "early receptor potential". The source of this current is under research.
- Molecular and thermal origins of fast photoelectric effects in the squid retina – The relative number of rhodopsin and its various stable photoproducts at the beginning of light excitation determine the waveform of a photoelectric voltage. Meanwhile, the thermal effect during the absorption also produces a thermoelectric voltage. The thermal effect can be corrected by the interconversion of rhodopsin and acid metarhodopsin molecules by illumination.
- Dark current and photocurrent in retinal rods – A steady current flows inward through the membrane of the rod outer segments in darkness, which is balanced by equal outward current distributed along the remainder of each rod. A photocurrent transiently reduces the dark current by the absorption of flashes. The photocurrent is apparently the primary sensory consequence of light absorption by rhodopsin.
- Kinetics of the photocurrent of retinal rods – An analysis of detectable properties leads to a series of conclusions about the mechanism of rod excitation as follows: (a) The kinetics of the photocurrent bear no simple relation to the formation or decay of any of the spectroscopic intermediates so far detected during the photolysis of rhodopsin. (b) The forms of both the amplitude- and rate-limiting processes are not compatible with organization of rhodopsin into "photoreceptive units" containing more than 300 chromophores. Even at high stimulus intensities most rhodopsin chromophores remain connected to the excitatory apparatus of rods. (c) The maximum rate of rise of the photocurrent is too fast to be consistent with the infolded disks of a rod outer segment being attached to the overlying plasma membrane. Most of the disks behave electrically as if isolated within the cell. (d) Control of the photocurrent at the outer segment membrane is likely to depend on control of the plasma membrane permeability by an agent released from the disks, instead of the segregation of the charge carriers of the current within the rod disks.
- Topology of the outer segment membranes of retinal rods and cones revealed by a fluorescent probe – The difference in staining of rod and cones with N,N'-didansyl cystine suggests that disk membranes of rods are not continuous with the plasma membranes. The difference in staining of rod and cones plasma membrane on outer segments of photoreceptors in electrophysiological and biochemical experiments, and to study the infolding pattern of rod and cone disks.
- Ionic mechanisms in excitation of photoreceptors – Both experimental results and theoretical calculations suggest the entrance position of the dark current in the plasma membrane and its underlying mechanism.
- Ionic aspects of excitation in rod outer segments – The current status of the problem of ionic mechanisms underlying excitation of vertebrate photoreceptors is reviewed.
- Control of Ca2+ in rod outer segment disks by light and cyclic GMP – Experiments are performed to show the required Ca2+ storage and release from rod disk membranes suspended in media containing high-energy phosphate esters and electrolytes approximating the cytoplasmic composition of live rod cells. Cyclic GMP stimulates Ca2+ uptake by rod outer segments disks in such media.
- Transduction heats in retinal rods: tests of the role of cGMP by pyroelectric calorimetry – The hypothesis that the sensory dark current of vertebrate retinal rods is controlled by a series of coupled biochemical cycles activated by light is tested by measuring heat production by live frog retinas when stimulated with sequences of light flashes of progressively increasing energy. However, the kinetics of the rod heat production and the splitting of 1-3 microM of free cytoplasmic cGMP during transduction do not match the predictions of cGMP control models at that time.
