= Zewail City of Science, Technology and Innovation =

Organization in Cairo, Egypt

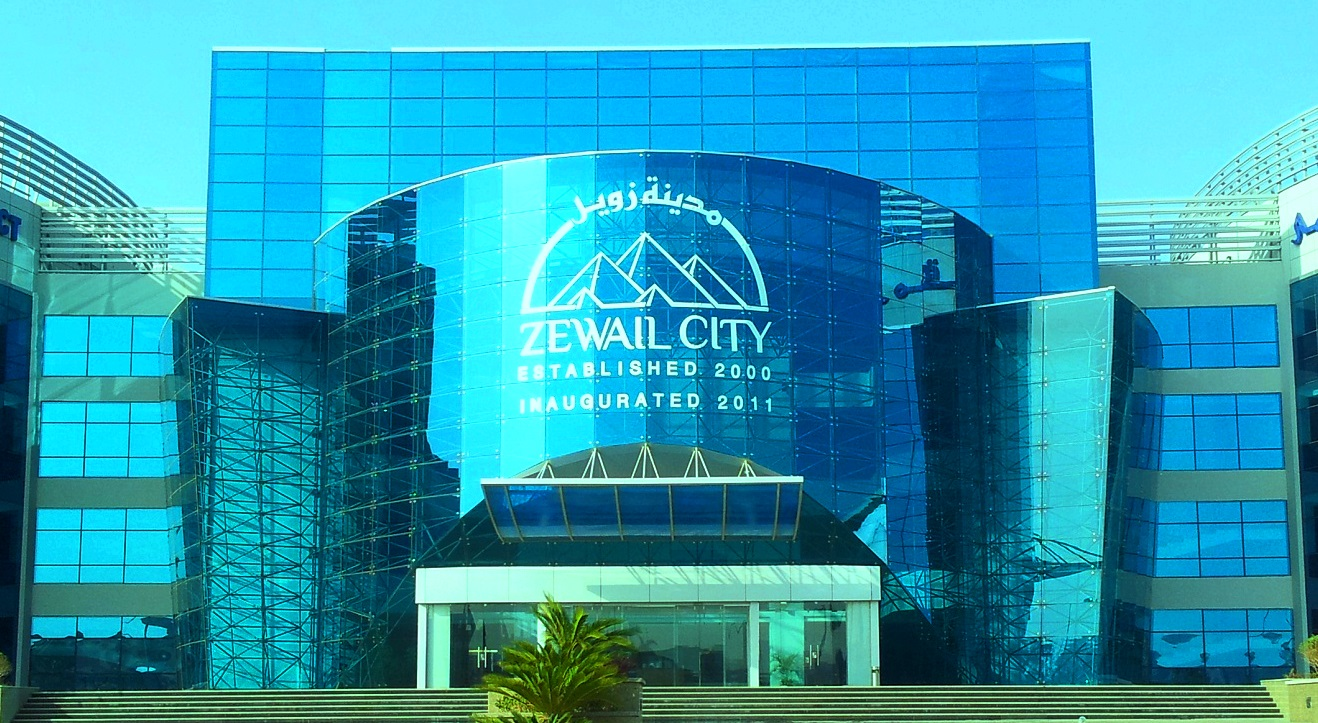
- Motto: “Egypt Can”
- Founder: Ahmed Zewail
- Established: 2011
- President: Acting Executive President : Dr. Mahmoud Abdrabou
- Formerly called: Zewail City of Science and Technology
- Location: 12578 Ahmed Zewail Street, October Gardens 6th of October City, Giza, Egypt
- Website: zewailcity.edu.eg

Zewail City of Science, Technology and Innovation is a nonprofit, independent institution of learning, research and innovation. The concept of the City was proposed in 1999 and its cornerstone laid on January 1, 2000. The City is named after its founder the late Dr. Ahmed Zewail, the Nobel laureate in chemistry 1999. After numerous delays, the project was revived by the Egyptian cabinet's decree on May 11, 2011 following the January 25 Revolution.

The Cabinet labeled it a National Project for Scientific Renaissance and named it Zewail City of Science and Technology. Zewail City of Science and Technology with its three constituents – the university, research institutes, and technology park.

== History ==
The cornerstone of Zewail City of Science and Technology was laid on January 1, 2000 in the Sheikh Zayed District of 6th of October City, Giza. Present at the ceremony were Ahmed Zewail, then Prime Minister Atef Ebeid, and a number of ministers including Ahmed Nazif, who later became involved in his capacity as Prime Minister.
After many delays in the City’s establishment, the January 25 revolution in 2011 led to the revival of the initiative, and Ahmed Zewail was asked by the Egyptian government to form the Supreme Advisory Board and re-launch the initiative on its original site. On May 11, 2011 the Cabinet of Ministers issued a decree to establish the National Project for Scientific Renaissance, and named it Zewail City of Science and Technology.
The City was officially inaugurated on November 1, 2011 in two buildings belonging to the Egyptian government on the Sheikh Zayed premises. The final legal status was established when the City was granted a law that outlines the City’s aims and constituents, as well as its financial and administrative structures.

In March 2015, Samih Sawiris donated 100 million Egyptian pounds to the City.

== Research institutes ==
Zewail city of science and technology currently has seven research institutes with further plans to increase this number to twelve. The main intention of the city is to cover all scientific fields required for development of the Egyptian society. The current institutes are:

=== Helmy Institutes for Medical Sciences (HIMS) ===
- Center for Aging and Associated Diseases (CAAD)
- Center of Excellence for Stem Cells Research and Regenerative Medicine (CESC)
- Center for Genomics (CG)

=== NBE Institute for Nanoscience and Informatics (INI) ===
- Center for Nanotechnology (CNT)
- Biosensors Research Centre (BRC)
- Center for Nanoelectronics and Devices
- Center for Materials Science

=== Institute for Imaging and Visualization (IIV) ===
- Center for Imaging and Microscopy
- Center for X-Ray Determination of the Structure of Matter

=== Institute for Basic Sciences (IBS) ===
- Center for Fundamental Physics (CFP)

=== Institute for Energy, Environment and Space (IEES) ===
- Center for Photonics and Smart Materials (CPSM)

=== Institute for Economics and Global Affairs(IEGA) ===
- Talaat Harb Center for Economics and Development (THC)

=== Institute for Virtual Education (IVE) ===
- Center for Learning Technologies (CLT)

== Expansion plans ==
Former Egyptian president Adly Mansour issued a decree on April 9, 2014 granting 198 acres to Zewail City for the construction of the new campus in the October Gardens of 6 October City. In March 2015, president Abdel Fattah al-Sisi decreed that the new campus be built by the Engineering Authority of the Egyptian Armed Forces and inaugurated in a one-year time frame. Zewail City’s University of Science and Technology and Research Institutes are now fully operational at the new campus as four building are completed (Helmy-Nano-Service-Academic). The headquarters is also fully functional in Cairo’s Garden City. Further plans include the possibility of opening another campus for the city in the New Suez Canal region during the coming years.

== See also ==
- Education in Egypt
- List of universities in Egypt
