= William Henry Knowles =

- Born: 14 May 1857; Newcastle upon Tyne
- Died: 18 January 1943 (aged 85); Malvern, Worcestershire
- Occupation: Architect
- Buildings: Armstrong College Newcastle

William Henry Knowles RIBA, FSA, FSAScot (14 May 1857 – 18 January 1943) was an architect, antiquarian and archaeologist. He was born in Newcastle upon Tyne, Northumberland and died in Malvern, Worcestershire. He designed many buildings in Newcastle upon Tyne and directed several archaeological excavations, most notably the excavations at Corstopium (Corbridge).

== Architectural practice ==
Knowles was articled to the architect William Lister Newcombe of Newcastle from 1872 to 1876 and after he completed his training he practised in Newcastle for 38 years. The history of Knowles's architectural work is complicated as he worked both on his own and in partnership with other architects. After leaving Newcombe he became an assistant to M G Cornell and Joseph Hall Morton before re-joining Newcombe as an assistant. He then had an independent practice in Gateshead in 1884; and then became a partner with Newcombe from 1885 to 1886. He formed a partnership with John Lamb and Charles F Armstrong from 1889 to 1893. The firm continued as Armstrong and Knowles from 1894 to 1889. In 1914 he was joined by N E Leeson and George Dale Oliver, to form Knowles, Oliver and Leeson. He became a fellow of the Royal Institute of British Architects in 1891.

His most important work was his appointment in 1903 to complete Armstrong College Newcastle, after the death of the original architect R J Johnson. Armstrong College later became King's College, part of Durham University, and later Newcastle University. Pevsner says, “The front [of the college] was added in 1904 by W H Knowles in the typical Tudor-cum-Baroque of that moment”. Knowles with his partners also designed buildings in the neo-Tudor style for the college - Fine Arts in 1911 and Agriculture in 1913 both by W H Knowles, and Architecture in 1922 by Knowles, Oliver and Leeson.

He designed the plinth and laid out the sited on which the statue of Lord Armstrong stands in front of the Hancock Museum in Newcastle.

The shipping magnate and property developer William Milburn commissioned Armstrong and Knowles to design Guyzance, a Tudor-style mansion near Acklington, Northumberland.

Other notable buildings include:

- The Mawson, Swan and Morgan building in Grey Street designed by W.H. Knowles and T.R. Milburn in 1904, now (2024) a Waterstones’ bookshop.
- Mosley Chambers at 28 and 30 Moseley Street, Newcastle by Armstrong and Knowles built as offices and shops in the Baroque style and 8 Mosley Street in the Arts and Crafts style. Knowles briefly occupied an office in this building
- The shop front for Fenwick's department store expansion in 1885, later destroyed by further expansion.
- Welbeck Road School (1905-6) in Walker, Newcastle.
- The School Board Offices in Northumberland Road, Newcastle built in 1900.

== Archaeological interests ==
Knowles was a keen antiquarian and archaeologist who wrote many papers for local and national journals, served on many committees and supervised excavations.

Knowles was elected a member of The Society of Antiquaries of Newcastle upon Tyne on 29th of October 1884 and became a member of the council in 1891 and vice president in January 1913. At his suggestion the upper room in the Black Gate of Newcastle castle was used as the Society's library and he provided the cases and furniture at his own expense. At the time of his death he was called the “father‟ of the society.

He was also a member of the Architectural and Archaeological Society of Durham and Northumberland. As a member of the History of Northumberland committee from 1900 he contributed plans and drawings of buildings to many of the volumes it published.

He was elected a Fellow of the Society of Antiquaries of London in 1899 and served as a member of the council of the society for 1915 – 1916. He was elected as a Fellow of the Society of Antiquaries of Scotland in 1906. He was also a member of the Royal Archaeological Institute.

After his retirement and move to Gloucestershire, he became a member of the Bristol and Gloucestershire Archaeological Society, the vice chairman of its council in 1928 and its president in 1930. He was also the chairman of the Gloucester Roman Research Committee which he founded, as well as a member of the bishop of Worcester's Advisory Committee for the care of churches, and the chairman of the Cheltenham Civic Society. He also served as a member of the executive of the Worcestershire branch of the Council for the Preservation of Rural England, a member of the councils of the Friends of Gloucester cathedral and of the friends Tewkesbury Abbey.

He published many papers on buildings, especially ecclesiastical architecture and on archaeology.

== Excavations ==
Knowles supervised may archaeological excavations including:

- The excavations at Corbridge, the Roman town of Corstopium between1907 and 1914, with R H Forster
- The barbican of Alnwick Castle 1902
- The castle at Newcastle
- Tynemouth Priory church
- The old church at Sockburn
- Castle Rushen, Isle of Man

After he retired and left Newcastle he continued archaeological work. In 1922 he excavated the Roman Baths in Bath for the Chief inspector of Ancient Monuments. The results were published in Archaeologia in 1924. He also excavated the Saxon priory church at Deerhurst in Gloucestershire. He supervised excavations of sites in Gloucester for the Gloucester Roman Research Committee which were published in the Transactions of the Bristol and Gloucestershire Archaeological Society.

== Personal life ==
Knowles married Jessie Benson, daughter of Councillor John Benson of Newcastle, in 1890. After Knowles retired in 1922 he left Newcastle, first moving to Cheltenham in Gloucestershire and then to Malvern in Worcestershire. Knowles was a freemason and served as the master of the Northumberland Lodge and as the Provincial Grand Warden in 1913.

Knowles served as an officer in the 1st Northumbrian Volunteer Artillery and during the First World War he was an officer in the 1st Northumberland Brigade of the Royal Artillery from 1915 until 1916.

== Publications by W H Knowles ==
Boyle, J. R. (1890) Vestiges of Old Newcastle and Gateshead. Newcastle upon Tyne. Illustrations by W H Knowles.

Burrow E. J, Knowles W H, Paine A E W, and Gray J W (1925) Excavations on Leckhampton Hill, Cheltenham, during the Summer of 1925. Transactions of the Bristol and Gloucestershire Archaeological Society 47:81-112.

Forster, R. H., and Knowles, W. H. (1908) The Corbridge Excavations, 1907. The Archaeological Journal 65: 53–61.

Clifford, E M The Roman Villa, Hucclecote (1933) Transactions of the Bristol and Gloucestershire Archaeological Society 55:323-376. Appendix on the buildings by W H Knowles 339-348.

Forster, R. H., and Knowles, W. H. (1909a) Corstopitum: Report of the Excavations in 1908. Archaeologica Aeliana 5: 305–242.

Forster, R. H., and Knowles, W. H. (1909b) The Romano-British Site of Corstopitum. An Account of the Excavations During 1907-8. Newcastle upon Tyne: Andrew Reid & Co.

Forster, R. H., and Knowles, W. H. (1910a) Corstopitum: report of the excavations of 1909. Archaeologia Aeliana 6: 205–272.

Forster, R. H., and Knowles, W. H. (1910b) The Romano-British Site of Corstopitum. An Account of the Excavations During 1909. Newcastle upon Tyne: Andrew Reid & Co.

Forster, R. H., and Knowles, W. H. (1914) Corstopitum: report on the excavations in 1913. Archaeologia Aeliana 11: 279.

Forster, R. H., and Knowles, W. H. (1915) Corstopitum: report on the excavations in 1914. Archaeologia Aeliana 12: 227–86.

Forster, R. H., Knowles, W. H., Haverfield, F. J., Craster, E. E., and Meek, A. (1911) Corstopitum: report of the excavations of 1910. Archaeologia Aeliana 7: 143–267.

Forster, R. H., Knowles, W. H., Haverfield, F. J., Craster, H. H. E., and Bushe-Fox, J. P. (1912) Corstopitum: report of the excavations of 1911. Archaeologia Aeliana 8: 137–263.

Forster, R. H., Knowles, W. H., Haverfield, F. J., and Newbold, P. (1913) Corstopitum: report of the excavations in 1912. Archaeologia Aeliana 9: 281.

Knowles, W. H. (n.d.). Ludworth tower. Proceedings of the Society of Antiquaries of Newcastle upon Tyne 4th ser. 6. Vol 6.

Knowles, W. H. (1889) Recent Excavations on the site of the Carmelites, or White Friars, at Newcastle. Archaeologia Aeliana 13: 346–350.

Knowles, W. H. (1890-95) Cocklaw Tower. Transactions of the Architectural and Archaeological Society of Durham and Northumberland. 4:309

Knowles, W. H. (1892) The Hospital of St. Mary the Virgin, Newcastle. Archaeologia Aeliana 15: 194–202.

Knowles, W. H. (1894) ‘Fox and Lamb’ Public House, Pilgrim Street, Newcastle. Archaeologia Aeliana 16: 373–378.

Knowles, W. H. (1896-1905a) Church of St John the Baptist Edlingham Northumberland. Transactions of the Architectural and Archaeological Society of Durham and Northumberland. 5:37

Knowles, W. H. (1896-1905b) Sockburn Church. Transactions of the Architectural and Archaeological Society of Durham and Northumberland

Knowles, W. H. (1898) Aydon Castle, Northumberland. Archaeologia 56(1): 71–88.

Knowles, W. H. (1899). ‘On an old house in Side, Newcastle, recently pulled down’. Proceedings of the Society of Antiquaries of Newcastle upon Tyne 6: 11.

Knowles, W. H. (1899). Easington and Seaham. Proceedings of the Society of Antiquaries of Newcastle upon Tyne. 8: 49-59.

Knowles, W. H. (1898a) The ‘Camera’ of Adam de Jesmond, Newcastle, popularly called ‘King John's Palace’. Archaeologia Aeliana 19: 29–38.

Knowles, W. H. (1898b) The Ogle Monument in Bothal Church, Northumberland. Archaeologia Aeliana 19: 243–254.

Knowles, W. H. (1898c) The Vicar's Pele, Corbridge. Archaeologia Aeliana 19.

Knowles, W. H. (1899a) An Effigy of a Knight in Warkworth Church, Northumberland. The Archaeological Journal 56: 6973.

Knowles, W. H. (1899b) The Bastle House at Doddington, Northumberland. Archaeologia Aeliana 21: 293–301.

Knowles, W. H. (1902) The Premonstratensian Abbey of St. Mary, Blanchland, Northumberland. The Archaeological Journal 59: 328–341.

Knowles, W. H. (1905). Notes on the well recently discovered in the tower at Chepchase Castle. Proceedings of the Society of Antiquaries of Newcastle upon Tyne ser 1. 1: 32-34.

Knowles, W. H. (1907). Fragment of a Roman latar discovered at Bywell. Proceedings of the Society of Antiquaries of Newcastle upon Tyne. 10:158-159.

Knowles, W. H. (1907). The Newcastle town wall near Sandgate. Proceedings of the Society of Antiquaries of Newcastle upon Tyne ser 2. 2: 63.

Knowles, W. H. (1908). Town Hall, Quayside, Newcastle. Proceedings of the Society of Antiquaries of Newcastle upon Tyne ser 3. 3,:56-58.

Knowles, W. H. (1909a) Excavations at Corstopium Northumberland. The Architectural Journal XVI: 509–524.

Knowles, W. H. (1909b) The Gatehouse and Barbican at Alnwick Castle, with an account of the recent discoveries. Archaeologia Aeliana 5.

Knowles, W. H., and Forster, R. H. (1909c) The Corbridge Excavations, 1908. The Archaeological Journal 66: 121–3.

Knowles, W. H. (1910a) The Church of the Holy Cross, Wallsend, Northumberland. Archaeologia Aeliana 6: 191.

Knowles, W. H. (1910b) The Priory Church of St. Mary and St. Oswin, Tynemouth, Northumberland. The Archaeological Journal 67: 1–50.

Knowles, W. H. (1915) Newburn Hall and Manor House, Northumberland. Archaeologia Aeliana 12: 186.

Knowles, W.H. 'Architecture of Old and Modern Newcastle', in Richardson, G.B. and Tomlinson, W.W. (1916) The Official Handbook to Newcastle and District. British Association, pp180-4. 413

Knowles, W. H. (1920) The Black Friars Monastery in Newcastle. Archaeologia Aeliana 17: 314.

Knowles, W. H. (1922) Robert Henry Forster. Journal of the British Archaeological Association 28(2): 293–295.

Knowles, W. H. (1923) Robert Henry Forster. The Eagle XLIII:190

Knowles, W. H. (1926a) The Castle, Newcastle upon Tyne. Archaeologia Aeliana 2: 1–51.

Knowles, W H (1926b) The recently discovered Church at Grafton near Beckford and the Churches of Great Washbourne and Stoke Orchard. Transactions of the Bristol and Gloucestershire Archaeological Society 48:287-300

Knowles, W. H. (1926c) I.—The Roman Baths at Bath; with an Account of the Excavations conducted during 1923. Archaeologia 75: 1–18.

Knowles, W H (1927) Deerhurst Priory Church, including the result of the excavations conducted during 1926. Transactions of the Bristol and Gloucestershire Archaeological Society 49:221-258

Knowles, W H (1928a) The Development of Architecture in Gloucestershire to the close of the Twelfth Century. Transactions of the Bristol and Gloucestershire Archaeological Society 50:57-96

Knowles, W. H. (1928b) Winstone Church, Gloucestershire. The Archaeological Journal 85: 176–187.

Knowles, W H (1928c) The Church of St. Nicholas, Ashchurch. Transactions of the Bristol and Gloucestershire Archaeological Society 50:97-102

Knowles, W. H. (1928) Deerhurst Priory Church: including the result of the excavations conducted during 1926. Archaeologia 77: 141–164.

Knowles, W H (1929). S James (old) church Charfield. Transactions of the Bristol and Gloucestershire Archaeological Society 51:1-16

Knowles, W H (1930a) Presidential Address. Transactions of the Bristol and Gloucestershire Archaeological Society 52:79-92

Knowles, W H (1930b) Teddington Church, Worcestershire. Transactions of the Bristol and Gloucestershire Archaeological Society 52:93-101

Knowles, W H (1930c) Elkstone Church, Gloucestershire. Transactions of the Bristol and Gloucestershire Archaeological Society 52:187-200

Knowles, W H (1931) The Church of S. John Baptist, Inglesham, Wilts. Transactions of the Bristol and Gloucestershire Archaeological Society 53:191-205

Knowles, W H (1932) Black Friars at Gloucester. Transactions of the Bristol and Gloucestershire Archaeological Society 54:167-201

Knowles, W H, Fullbrook-Leggatt, L. E. W. O. (1934) Gloucester Roman Research Committee: report on the Barbican and Bon Marche sites. Transactions of the Bristol and Gloucestershire Archaeological Society 56:65-82

Knowles, W. H. (1935). St. Nicholas' cathedral church, St. John's Church, and St. Andrew's Church, Newcastle. Proceedings of the Society of Antiquaries of Newcastle upon Tyne. 7: 113-122.

Knowles, W H (1938) Gloucester Roman Research Committee: report 1938-9. Transactions of the Bristol and Gloucestershire Archaeological Society 60:165-168
