= Attila Szabo (scientist) =

Biophysicist

- Born: 1947 (age 78–79); Budapest, Hungary
- Education: McGill University; Harvard University
- Scientific career
- Fields: Biophysics
- Workplaces: National Institute of Diabetes and Digestive and Kidney Diseases
- Doctoral advisor: Martin Karplus

Attila Szabo is a biophysicist who is a Distinguished Investigator and Section Chief of the Theoretical Biophysical Chemistry Section in the Laboratory of Chemical Physics at the National Institute of Diabetes and Digestive and Kidney Diseases, part of the United States National Institutes of Health.

== Early life and education ==
Szabo was born in Budapest, Hungary in 1947. His family left Hungary in response to the Hungarian Revolution of 1956 - he later recalled a dramatic escape over the border to Austria - and immigrated to Canada, settling in Montreal. Interested in chemistry since he was a child, Szabo studied the subject at McGill University as an undergraduate and received his bachelor's degree in 1968. He then began graduate school at Harvard University, where he joined Martin Karplus' research group. There he was introduced to theoretical work on NMR spectroscopy and developed a statistical mechanical model of the hemoglobin protein. Szabo accompanied Karplus on a sabbatical in Paris in 1972, and then spent a year in Cambridge working jointly with David Buckingham and Max Perutz. Szabo received his Ph.D. from Harvard in 1973.

== Academic career ==
Szabo joined the faculty at the University of Indiana, Bloomington in 1974. NMR was an active area of research there at the time and Szabo became involved in developing theoretical models to interpret NMR studies of biomolecules. Among the resulting work on NMR relaxation, the Lipari-Szabo model-free formalism for modeling the dynamics of molecules was most influential and remains in active use in the field. While at Indiana Szabo also co-authored a textbook on quantum chemistry with fellow Karplus lab member Neil Ostlund.

In 1979, Szabo was informed that he had not received tenure at Indiana. As he later recalled, his Ph.D. advisor Karplus connected him with Bill Eaton at the National Institute of Diabetes and Digestive and Kidney Diseases, who recruited Szabo to NIDDK. Szabo has remained at NIDDK since and is currently Section Chief of the Theoretical Biophysical Chemistry Section in the Laboratory of Chemical Physics. His research group currently works on developing theoretical models of single-molecule experiments, including collaborations with Irina Gopich and Gerhard Hummer. Szabo was elected to the National Academy of Sciences in 2010.
