= Mohamed H. Alkordi =

Egyptian material scientist and academic

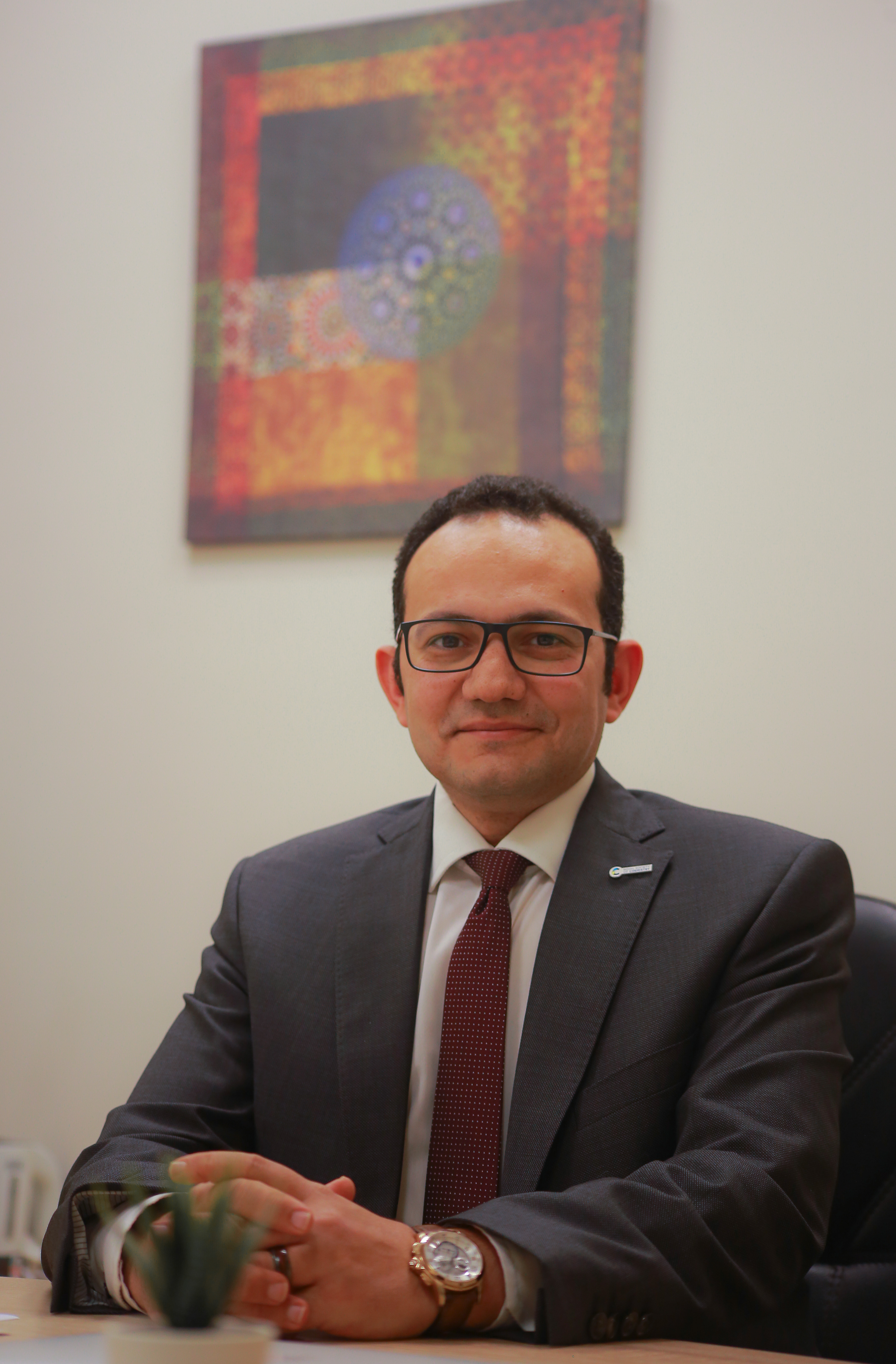

Academic background
- Education: Alexandria University (B.Sc. 2005); University of South Florida (Ph.D. 2010)

Academic work
- Discipline: Materials Science
- Institutions: Zewail City of Science and Technology

Mohamed H. Alkordi is a Professor of Materials Science, co-director of the Center for Material Science and Director of the Research Office at Zewail City of Science and Technology.

== Education ==
Alkordi earned his B.Sc. in Chemistry and Physics from Alexandria University in 2005, and his Ph.D. in chemistry from the University of South Florida, Tampa, Florida, USA, in 2010.

== Research interests ==
His current research interests are within the realm of innovation and engineering of novel material for mitigating the environmental impact of modern society's activities, focusing on wastewater treatment as well as innovative energy storage and conversion applications. His work is primarily in microporous solids, known as Metal-Organic Frameworks, constructed through the self-assembly of molecular precursors. The permanent porosity of these materials allows for their utilization in a myriad of demanding applications where the chemical space within the pores of such solids can readily be tuned and, further, designed. Of primary interest to his research is to gain a more in-depth understanding of the structure-function relationships pertinent to the nanospace within microporous solids. It is through a better understanding of such fundamental aspects of microporous solids that we can outline blueprint designs to generate novel material tailored to specific applications. Among the applications his group is targeting are wastewater treatment through inventive materials for the capture of heavy metals, organic small molecules, and Perfluorinated compound. Additionally, his research includes designing new material for energy storage (Supercapacitor and Rechargeable battery) and energy conversion through microporous catalysts in electrocatalytic water splitting.

== Honors and awards ==
His research accomplishments have been recognized by several awards and honors, including "State Encouragement Award", and "Presidential Excellence Accolade of First Grade" in 2016, Best research article in COMSTECH in 2017, and Selected among world's Top 1% reviewers for Materials Science, awarded by Publons in 2018 and 2019. He also received the Alexander von Humboldt-Georg Forster Experienced Researchers Fellowship in 2019–2023, was selected as a Fellow of the African Academy of Sciences in 2019 and Fellow of the Royal Society of Chemistry in 2021.

== Publications ==
- Safy, M..E., Amin, M., Haikal, R..R., Elshazly, B., Wang, J., Wang, Y., Wöll, C. and Alkordi, M. H.* Probing the Water Stability Limits and Degradation Pathways of Metal‐Organic Frameworks (MOFs). Chem. Eur. J., 2020, 26, 7109–7117. doi:10.1002/chem.202000207
- Shruti Suriyakumar, A Manuel Stephan, N Angulakshmi, Mohamed H Hassan, and Mohamed H. Alkordi*. Metal-organic framework@SiO2 as permselective separator for lithium-sulfur batteries. J. Mater. Chem. A, 2018, 6, 14623–14632.
- Rapti, S.; Sarma, D.; Diamantis, S. A.; Skliri, E.; Armatas, G. S.; Tsipis, A. C.; Hassan, Y. S.; Alkordi, M.; Malliakas, C. D.; Kanatzidis, M. G.; Lazarides, T.; Plakatouras, J. C.; Manos, M. J., All in one porous material: exceptional sorption and selective sensing of hexavalent chromium by using a Zr4+ MOF. Journal of Materials Chemistry A 2017, 5 (28), 14707–14719.
- Xue, D.-X.; Cairns, A. J.; Belmabkhout, Y.; Wojtas, L.; Liu, Y.; Alkordi, M. H.; Eddaoudi, M., Tunable rare-earth fcu-MOFs: a platform for systematic enhancement of CO2 adsorption energetics and uptake. Journal of the American Chemical Society 2013, 135 (20), 7660–7667.
- Alkordi, M. H.; Brant, J. A.; Wojtas, L.; Kravtsov, V. C.; Cairns, A. J.; Eddaoudi, M., Zeolite-like metal− organic frameworks (ZMOFs) based on the directed assembly of finite metal− organic cubes (MOCs). Journal of the American Chemical Society 2009, 131 (49), 17753–17755.
- Cairns, A. J.; Perman, J. A.; Wojtas, L.; Kravtsov, V. C.; Alkordi, M. H.; Eddaoudi, M.; Zaworotko, M. J., Supermolecular building blocks (SBBs) and crystal design: 12-connected open frameworks based on a molecular cubohemioctahedron. Journal of the American Chemical Society 2008, 130 (5), 1560–1561.
- Alkordi, M. H.; Liu, Y.; Larsen, R. W.; Eubank, J. F.; Eddaoudi, M., Zeolite-like metal− organic frameworks as platforms for applications: on metalloporphyrin-based catalysts. Journal of the American Chemical Society 2008, 130 (38), 12639–12641.
