= Robert Foster =

Robert Foster may refer to:

== Politics ==
- Robert Foster (politician) (born 1983), member of Mississippi House of Representatives
- Robert E. Foster (1851–1931), member of the Mississippi House of Representatives
- Robert Coleman Foster (1769–1844), member of Tennessee House of Representatives and Senate
- Robert Sidney Foster (1913–2005), governor-general of Fiji

== Sports ==
- Robert Foster (American football) (born 1994), American football wide receiver
- Robert Foster (baseball) (1856–1921), baseball player in 1884
- Robert Foster (cricketer) (1880–1946), Jamaican cricketer
- Robert Foster (hurdler) (born 1970), Jamaican track and field athlete
- Robert Foster (swimmer) (1891–1960), American swimmer

== Other ==
- Robert Foster (judge) (1589–1663), Lord Chief Justice of England
- Robert D. Foster (1811–1878), Latter Day Saint turned opponent of Joseph Smith
- Robert Sanford Foster (1834–1903), Union general
- Robert Foster (RAF officer) (1898–1973), RAF commander during World War II
- Robert Frederick Foster (1853–1945), memory training promoter and author of books on games
- Robert P. Foster (1917–2008), president of Northwest Missouri State University (1964–1977)
- Robert Foster (author) (born 1949), author of The Complete Guide to Middle-earth
- R. F. Foster (historian) (born 1949), British historian
- Robert Foster (bishop) (died 2013), Jamaican bishop of the Moravian Church, see Jamaica Province of the Moravian Church
- Robert A. Foster, actor in Just William
- Robert Foster, an antagonist in the film Executive Action, portrayed by Robert Ryan

== See also ==
- Bob Foster (disambiguation)
- Robert Forster (disambiguation)
