= Kiyoshi Mizuuchi =

Japanese biochemist

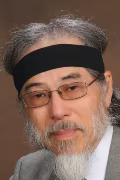
- Education: Osaka University (BS) (MS) (PhD)
- Scientific career
- Fields: Chromosome biology
- Workplaces: National Institute of Diabetes and Digestive and Kidney Diseases
- Website: NIDDKD Staff Directory

Kiyoshi Mizuuchi (水内 潔, Mizuuchi Kiyoshi) is a Japanese biochemist.

Mizuuchi completed his undergraduate and graduate studies at Osaka University. He received the NAS Award in Molecular Biology 1989, and he was named a foreign associate of the United States National Academy of Sciences in 1994, while working for the National Institutes of Health's National Institute of Diabetes and Digestive and Kidney Diseases (NIDDKD).

In 2014, Mizuuchi and his postdoctoral fellow Anthony Vecchiarelli were awarded the Cozzarelli Prize - an annual award given by the Proceedings of the National Academy of Sciences (PNAS) to recognize research papers published in the journal that demonstrate exceptional scientific excellence and originality across various scientific fields. The award recognized their paper: "A propagating ATPase gradient drives transport of surface-confined cellular cargo"

In 2016, Mizuuchi and his postdoctoral fellow Anthony Vecchiarelli won the Federation of American Societies for Experimental Biology (FASEB)'s BioArt competition by videotaping the oscillations of fluorescently-labeled Min system proteins involved in bacterial septum localization.
