= Robert Henry Forster (archaeologist) =

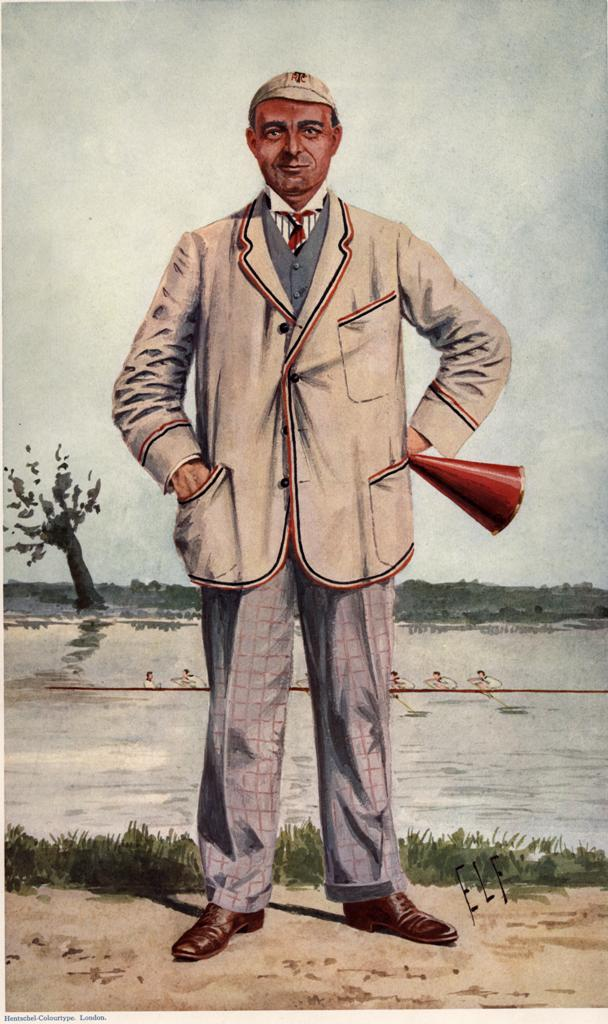
Robert Henry Forster

Robert Henry Forster FSA (10 March 1867 – 6 June 1923) was an English barrister, antiquarian, archaeologist, poet and novelist.

== Early life ==
Forster was born in Earsdon, Northumberland, and came from a family of mining engineers. He was the fourth son of George Baker Forster, a mining engineer, and Hannah Elizabeth Todd, daughter of Reverend Isaac Todd of Shincliffe. George Baker Forster was the son of Thomas Emerson Forster also a mining engineer. George Baker Forster had been educated at St. John’s college Cambridge and had rowed for Cambridge against Oxford at Henley in 1853. In later life George Baker Forster lived at Farnley Hill in Corbridge. R H Forster was educated at Harrow school and then won a scholarship to St. John’s college Cambridge in 1885. He was awarded the Leaf scholarship and a Foundation scholarship in 1887. In 1888, he was in the first class of the classical Tripos and the following year was Senior in the Law Tripos. He was called to the bar in 1892 but did not practise law, instead publishing poetry and novels.

== Poet and novelist ==
Forster began his literary career by publishing articles in The Eagle, the St John’s college magazine. His first novel “The Hand of the Spoiler” was published in 1898, followed by “The Amateur Antiquary” a collection of essays on antiquarian subjects. He published a number of historical novels and volumes of poetry as well as many papers on archaeological subjects.

== Rowing ==
Forster, like his father, was a keen rower and rowed for the Lady Margaret Boat Club (St John’s college) at Cambridge. In 1892 became joint secretary of the Thames Rowing Club with L H K Bushe-Fox, a friend from Cambridge who was a fellow of St John’s college and also a barrister. Forster was the captain of the Thames Rowing Club from 1896 to 1907.

== Archaeological work ==
In 1907 Forster began supervising the excavation work at Corbridge, Northumberland, the Roman site of Corstopitum, with W H Knowles. He supervised the excavations for the next eight seasons until 1914 when the outbreak of the First World War ended the excavation work. This can be considered one of the first training excavations in Britain. One of the people employed here was J P Bushe-Fox, the younger brother of L H K Bushe-Fox, Forster's old Cambridge friend.

Forster also wrote up, with others, the results of each season’s work at Corbridge in Archaeologia Aeliana, the journal of the Society of Antiquaries of Newcastle upon Tyne.

R H Forster was the Treasurer of the British Archaeological Association in 1905, and one of its vice presidents in 1911.

== Personal life ==
He married Margret Hope in 1913. He retired to Combeinteignhead in Devon where he died in 1923.

== Bibliography ==
- Forster, Robert Henry (1898). The hand of the spoiler: being the adventures of Master Wilfrid Clavering ... Newcastle-on-Tyne.
- Forster, Robert Henry (1899). The amateur antiquary: his notes, sketches, and fancies concerning the Roman wall in the counties of Northumberland and Cumberland. Newcastle-on-Tyne; London: s.n.
- Forster, Robert Henry (1905). In old Northumbria. [Verse.] London.
- Forster, R H; Craster, E Edmund (1908). "Corstopitum: Report of the Excavations in 1907". Archaeologica Aeliana. 4: 205.
- Forster, Robert Henry (1901). Down by the river. A rowing man's miscellany. Camb.
- Forster, Robert Henry (1902). A Tynedale comedy. Newcastle-upon-Tyne.
- Forster, Robert Henry (1903). The last foray. London.
- Forster, Robert Henry (1903). Idylls of the north. London.
- Forster, Robert Henry (1904). In steel and leather. London.
- Forster, Robert Henry (1905). Strained allegiance. London.
- Forster, Robert Henry (1906). The arrow of the north. London.
- Forster, Robert Henry (1907). The mistress of Aydon ... London.
- Forster, Robert Henry (1908). A Jacobite admiral. London.
- Forster, Robert Henry (1909). Harry of Athol. London.
- Forster, R H; Knowles, W H (1910). "Corstopitum: report of the excavations of 1909". Archaeologia Aeliana. 3. 6: 205–272.
- Forster, Robert Henry (1911). Midsummer morn. London.
- Forster, R. H. (1910). "The Corbridge Excavations, 1910". Journal of the British Archaeological Association. 16 (1): 1–14. doi:10.1080/00681288.1910.11893887.
- Forster, R H; Knowles, W H (1910). "Corstopitum: report of the excavations of 1909". Archaeologia Aeliana. 3. 6: 205–272.
- Forster, R H; Knowles, W H; Haverfield, F J; Craster, H H E; Bushe-Fox, J P (1912). "Corstopitum: report of the excavations of 1911". Archaeologia Aeliana. 3. 8: 137–263.
- Forster, Robert Henry (1913). The little maister. London.
- Forster, R. H. (1913). "The Corbridge Excavations, 1912". Journal of the British Archaeological Association. 19 (2): 84–87. doi:10.1080/00681288.1913.11893654. ISSN 0068-1288.
- Forster, Robert Henry (1920). The double realm. [Verse.] London.
- Forster, Robert Henry (1922). Two romances in verse. [Argalis and Alauna: Cunetzo and Loxa.] London.
- Forster, Robert Henry (1923). A Devonshire garden: sonnets written there in 1922. London.
- Forster, R. H. (1926). The History of the Lady Margaret Boat Club ... 1825-1926 ... 1825-1890 by R. H. Foster [sic] ... & W. Harris ... 1890-1907 by A. D. Stammers ... 1907-1925 by G. L. Day, etc. (Second edition - vol. 2 1926-1956, by J. F. Hall-Craggs.) [With plates.] Cambridge: Johnian Society.
- Forster, R. H. (1914). War poems of a Northumbrian. Newcastle-on-Tyne: Edward J. Noble.
