= Handbook of Electrochemistry =

Reference work edited by Cynthia Zoski

- Handbook of Electrochemistry
- Author: Cynthia Zoski (editor)
- Language: English
- Genre: Chemistry
- Publisher: Elsevier
- Publication date: 2006
- Media type: Print (Hardcover)
- Pages: 934
- ISBN: 978-0-444-51958-0

The Handbook of Electrochemistry, edited by Cynthia Zoski, is a sourcebook containing a wide range of electrochemical information. It provides details of experimental considerations, typical calculations, and illustrates many of the possibilities open to electrochemical experimentators.

The book has five sections: Fundamentals, Laboratory Practical, Techniques, Applications, and Data - and each contains a series of entries by a range of scholars.
