= National Institute of Diabetes and Digestive and Kidney Diseases =

Part of the United States National Institutes of Health

Coordinates: 39.02314°N 77.13778°W

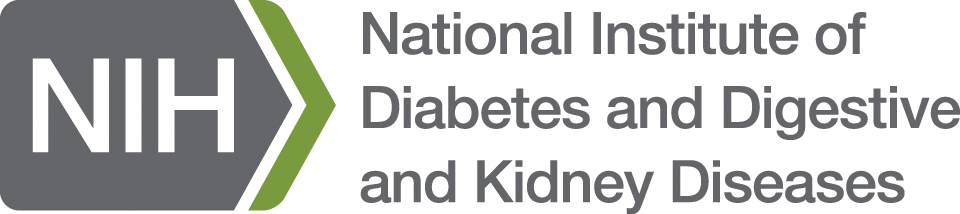
- National Institute of Diabetes and Digestive and Kidney Diseases (NIDDK) Logo
- Abbreviation: NIDDK
- Formation: August 15, 1950
- Type: U.S. Government Agency
- Legal status: Active
- Headquarters: Bethesda, Maryland
- Region served: United States
- Official language: English
- Director: Griffin P. Rodgers
- Parent organization: National Institutes of Health
- Affiliations: United States Public Health Service
- Website: niddk.nih.gov

The National Institute of Diabetes and Digestive and Kidney Diseases (NIDDK) is part of the United States National Institutes of Health, which in turn is part of the Department of Health and Human Services. NIDDK is approximately the fifth-largest of the 27 NIH institutes. The institute's mission is to support research, training, and communication with the public in the topic areas of "diabetes and other endocrine and metabolic diseases; digestive diseases, nutritional disorders, and obesity; and kidney, urologic, and hematologic diseases". As of 2021, the Director of the institute is Griffin P. Rodgers, who assumed the position on an acting basis in 2006 and on a permanent basis in 2007.

== Mission ==
The mission of the National Institute of Diabetes and Digestive and Kidney Diseases (NIDDK) is to conduct and support medical research and research training and to disseminate science-based information on diabetes and other endocrine and metabolic diseases; digestive diseases, nutritional disorders, and obesity; and kidney, urological, and hematologic diseases, to improve people's health and quality of life.

== History ==
The institute that would become NIDDK was established in 1947 as the Experimental Biology and Medicine Institute, subsequently incorporated in 1950 by President Harry S Truman into the National Institute of Arthritis and Metabolic Diseases. The name of the institute was changed in 1972 to National Institute of Arthritis, Metabolism, and Digestive Diseases, again in 1981 to National Institute of Arthritis, Diabetes, and Digestive and Kidney Diseases, and to its present name in 1986 following the creation of a separate National Institute of Arthritis and Musculoskeletal and Skin Diseases (NIAMS).

== Past directors ==
Directors from 1950 - present

No.	Portrait	Director	Took office	Left office	Refs.
1		William H. Sebrell Jr.	August 15, 1950	October 1, 1950	
2		Russell M. Wilder	March 6, 1951	June 30, 1953	
3		Floyd S. Daft	October 1, 1953	May 3, 1962	
acting		G. Donald Whedon	May 4, 1962	November 22, 1962	
4		G. Donald Whedon	November 23, 1962	September 30, 1981	
acting		Lester B. Salans	October 1, 1981	June 16, 1982	
5		Lester B. Salans	June 17, 1982	June 30, 1984	
acting		Pierre F. Renault	July 1, 1984	January 6, 1985	
6		Mortimer B. Lipsett	January 7, 1985	September 4, 1986	
7		Phillip Gorden	September 5, 1986	November 14, 1999	
8		Allen M. Spiegel	November 15, 1999	March 3, 2006	
acting		Griffin P. Rodgers	March 4, 2006	March 31, 2007	
9		Griffin P. Rodgers	April 1, 2007	Present	

== Programs ==
The NIDDK intramural research program is divided into ten branches that perform basic and clinical research at locations in Bethesda, Maryland, and Phoenix, Arizona.

The extramural research program is divided into three divisions: Diabetes, Endocrinology, and Metabolic Diseases; Digestive Diseases and Nutrition; and Kidney, Urologic, and Hematologic Diseases.

The NIDDK Office of the Director also administrates two notable programs: the Office of Minority Health Research Coordination, established to investigate disparities in health outcomes for minority groups, and the Office of Obesity Research, which organizes research into obesity and metabolic diseases.

The institute also conducts public health awareness campaigns on common, underdiagnosed, undertreated diseases within its purview.

The NIDDK also offers opportunities for students to become involved in research, including the Short-Term Research Experience for Underrepresented Persons (STEP-UP) program, which is currently led by program director Robert Rivers since 2014.

== Central Repository ==
In 2003, NIDDK established a Central Repository to share biological samples and research data with the research community. The three components—the Data, Biosample, and Genetic Repositories—accept submissions of database archives, biological specimens, and blood and DNA samples, respectively, and are responsible for proper storage, maintenance, and distribution of requested materials to qualified researchers.

== NIDDK legislative chronology ==
December 11, 1947—The Experimental Biology and Medicine Institute was established under Section 202 of Public Law (P.L.) 78—410.

August 15, 1950—The Omnibus Medical Research Act (P.L. 81—692) established the NIAMD to "... conduct researches relating to the cause, prevention, and methods of diagnosis and treatment of arthritis and rheumatism and other metabolic diseases, to assist and foster such researches and other activities by public and private agencies, and promote the coordination of all such researches, and to provide training in matters relating to such disease..." Section 431 also authorized the U.S. Surgeon General to establish a national advisory council.

May 19, 1972—President Richard M. Nixon signed P.L. 92–305 to re-emphasize digestive diseases research by changing the name of the institute to the National Institute of Arthritis, Metabolism, and Digestive Diseases (NIAMDD) and by designating a digestive diseases committee within the institute's National Advisory Council.

July 23, 1974—The National Diabetes Mellitus Research and Education Act (P.L. 93—354) was signed. The National Commission on Diabetes, authorized by this act, was chartered on September 17, 1974. The act authorized diabetes research and training centers, and an intergovernmental diabetes coordinating committee that included representatives from the NIAMDD and six other NIH Institutes.

January 1975—The National Arthritis Act of 1974 (P.L. 93—640) was signed into law to further research, education, and training in the field of connective tissue diseases. The act authorized the creation of a national commission, centers for research and training in arthritis and rheumatic diseases, a data bank, and an overall plan to investigate the epidemiology, etiology, control, and prevention of these disorders.

October 1976—The Arthritis, Diabetes, and Digestive Diseases Amendments of 1976 (P.L. 94—562) established the National Diabetes Advisory Board, charged with advising Congress and the Health, Education, and Welfare (HEW) Secretary on implementing the Long-Range Plan to Combat Diabetes developed by the National Commission on Diabetes. The law also established the National Commission on Digestive Diseases to investigate the incidence, duration, mortality rates, and social and economic impact of digestive diseases.

December 1980—Title II of the Health Programs Extension Act of 1980, P.L. 96-538, changed the institute's name to the National Institute of Arthritis, Diabetes, and Digestive and Kidney Diseases. The Act also established the National Digestive Diseases Advisory Board. The law authorized the National Diabetes Information Clearinghouse, the Diabetes Data Group, and the National Digestive Diseases Information and Education Clearinghouse. In addition, it reauthorized advisory boards for arthritis and diabetes research.

November 20, 1985—The Health Research Extension Act of 1985 (P.L. 99–158) changed the institute's name to the National Institute of Diabetes and Digestive and Kidney Diseases. The act also established the National Kidney and Urologic Diseases Advisory Board. The law gave parallel special authorities to all Institute operating divisions, including authorization of the National Kidney and Urologic Diseases Information Clearinghouse; National Kidney, Urologic, and Hematologic Diseases Coordinating Committee; National Kidney and Urologic Diseases Data System; National Digestive Diseases Data System; Kidney and Urologic Diseases Research Centers; and Digestive Diseases Research Centers.

June 10, 1993—The NIH Revitalization Act of 1993 (P.L. 103–43) established the NIDDK as the lead Institute in nutritional disorders and obesity, including the formation of a research and training centers program on nutritional disorders and obesity. The act also provided for the directors of the National Institute of Arthritis and Musculoskeletal and Skin Diseases, National Institute on Aging, National Institute of Dental Research, and the NIDDK to expand and intensify research and related programs concerning osteoporosis, Paget's disease, and related bone disorders.

July 25, 1997—A House report accompanying H.R. 2264 and Senate report with S. 1061, FY 1998 appropriations bills for Labor/HHS/Education, urged NIH and NIDDK to establish a diabetes research working group to develop a comprehensive plan for NIH-funded diabetes research that would recommend future initiatives and directions. Dr. C. Ronald Kahn, diabetes research working group chairman, presented "Conquering Diabetes, A Strategic Plan for the 21st Century" to the Congress on March 23, 1999.

August 5, 1997—The Balanced Budget Act of 1997 (P.L. 105–33), as immediately amended by the Taxpayer Relief Act of 1997 (P.L. 105–34), established a Special Statutory Funding Program for Type 1 Diabetes Research (now Section 330B of the Public Health Service Act). This legislation provided $30 million per year for FY 1998 through FY 2002. (The program has been extended and has had funding increased in subsequent years.) This funding program augments regularly appropriated funds HHS receives for diabetes research through the Labor-HHS-Education appropriations committees. The NIDDK, through authority granted by the HHS Secretary, has a leadership role in planning, administering, and evaluating the allocation of these funds. In parallel with the Special Statutory Funding Program for Type 1 Diabetes Research, P.L. 105-33 also established the Special Diabetes Program for Indians, which is administered by the Indian Health Service.

October 17, 2000—Title IV, Section 402 of the Children's Health Act of 2000 (P.L. 106–310) entitled "Reducing the Burden of Diabetes Among Children and Youth" specified that the NIH conduct long-term epidemiology studies, support regional clinical research centers, and provide a national prevention effort relative to type 1 diabetes.

December 21, 2000—The FY 2001 Consolidated Appropriations Act (P.L. 106–554) increased funding for the Special Statutory Funding Program for Type 1 Diabetes Research to $100 million per year for FY 2001 and FY 2002, and extended the program at a level of $100 million for FY 2003.

December 17, 2002—The Public Health Service Act amendment relating to diabetes research (P.L. 107–360) extended and augmented the Special Statutory Funding Program for Type 1 Diabetes Research. The law provided $150 million per year for type 1 diabetes research from FY 2004 through FY 2008.

December 8, 2003—Title VII, Subtitle D, Section 733 of the Medicare Prescription Drug, Improvement, and Modernization Act of 2003 (P.L. 108–173) authorized the NIDDK to conduct a pancreatic islet transplantation clinical trial that includes Medicare beneficiaries. Medicare would cover routine costs, transplantation, and appropriate related items and services for Medicare beneficiaries enrolled in the trial.

October 25, 2004—The Pancreatic Islet Cell Transplantation Act of 2004 (P.L. 108–362) amended the Public Health Service Act to increase the supply of pancreatic islet cells for research and provide better coordination of federal efforts and information on islet cell transplantation. A provision of this law specified that the annual reports prepared by the NIDDK-led Diabetes Mellitus Interagency Coordinating Committee include an assessment of the federal activities and programs related to pancreatic islet transplantation.

September 2004—The reports accompanying the FY 2005 Senate and House Labor, HHS, and Education appropriations bills (Senate Report 108-345 and House Report108-636) called on the NIH and HHS to establish a national commission on digestive diseases to develop a long-range research plan. The NIH director subsequently established the National Commission on Digestive Diseases under NIDDK leadership in August 2005.

December 29, 2007—The Medicare, Medicaid, and SCHIP Extension Act of 2007 (P.L. 110–173) extended funding for the Special Statutory Funding Program for Type 1 Diabetes Research. The law provided $150 million for type 1 diabetes research in FY 2009.

July 15, 2008—The Medicare Improvements for Patients and Providers Act of 2008 (P.L. 110–275) extended funding for the Special Statutory Funding Program for Type 1 Diabetes Research. The law provided $150 million per year for type 1 diabetes research in FY 2010 and FY 2011.

February 17, 2009—President Barack Obama signed the American Recovery and Reinvestment Act (ARRA) of 2009 (P.L. 111–5), providing the NIH with a two-year infusion of funding. The NIDDK developed a plan to use its portion of the ARRA funds to meet the stimulus goals set forth in the Recovery Act. This funding supported a range of biomedical research efforts across the institute's research mission.

June 15, 2010—H. Res. 1444, a bipartisan resolution recognizing the 60th anniversary of the NIDDK, was introduced.

December 15, 2010—The Medicare and Medicaid Extenders Act of 2010 (P.L. 111–309) extended funding for the Special Statutory Funding Program for Type 1 Diabetes Research. The law provided $150 million per year for type 1 diabetes research in FY 2012 and FY 2013.

January 2, 2013—The American Taxpayer Relief Act of 2012 (P.L. 112–240) extended funding for the Special Statutory Funding Program for Type 1 Diabetes Research. The law provided $150 million for type 1 diabetes research in FY 2014.

April 1, 2014—The Protecting Access to Medicare Act of 2014 (P.L. 113–93) extended the Special Statutory Funding Program for Type 1 Diabetes Research. The law provided $150 million for type 1 diabetes research in FY 2015.

== Notable NIDDK Intramural Scientists Elected to the United States National Academy of Sciences ==
Laboratory of Chemical Physics

Ad Bax ForMemRS, G. Marius Clore FMedSci, FRS, William Eaton, William Hagins (1928–2012), Robert Tycko, Attila Szabo, Robert Zwanzig (1928–2014)

Laboratory of Molecular Biology

David Davies (1927–2016), Gary Felsenfeld (1930-2024), Martin Gellert, Terrell Hill (1917–2014), Kiyoshi Mizuuchi, Wei Yang

Laboratory of Biochemistry and Genetics

Herb Tabor, Reed Wickner

Laboratory of Bioorganic Chemistry

John W. Daly (1933–2008), Bernhard Witkop (1917–2010)

Laboratory of Nutrition and Endocrinology

Martin Rodbell (1925–1998)

Clinical Endocrinology Branch

Ed Rall (1920–2008)

Metabolic Diseases Branch

Gerald Auerbach (1927–1991)

== Notable NIDDK Intramural Scientists Elected to the Royal Society ==
Laboratory of Chemical Physics

Ad Bax ForMemRS, G. Marius Clore FMedSci, FRS
