= Encyclopedia of Analytical Chemistry =

English-language multi-volume encyclopedia published by John Wiley & Sons

The Encyclopedia of Analytical Chemistry is an English-language multi-volume encyclopedia published by John Wiley & Sons.

It is a comprehensive analytical chemistry reference, covering all aspects from theory and instrumentation through applications and techniques. Containing over 600 articles and over 6500 illustrations the 15-volume print edition published in 2000. The encyclopedia has been available online since the end of 2006.
