= Robin M. Hochstrasser =

Scottish chemist

Robin Hochstrasser
- Born: January 4, 1931; Edinburgh, Scotland
- Died: 27 February 2013 (aged 82)
- Education: Heriot-Watt University; University of Edinburgh
- Awards: E. Bright Wilson Award in Spectroscopy (1998); Centenary Silver Medal (2000); Benjamin Franklin Medal (2003); Linus Pauling Award (2012)
- Scientific career
- Fields: Chemistry
- Workplaces: University of Pennsylvania; University of British Columbia; University of Grenoble
- Doctoral students: Ahmed Zewail

Robin M. Hochstrasser (4 January 1931 – 27 February 2013) was a Scottish-born British-American chemist.

== Biography ==
Hochstrasser was born in Edinburgh, Scotland. In 1952, he received his B.S. from Heriot-Watt University and 3 years later got his Ph.D. from University of Edinburgh. In 1957 he joined the faculty at the University of British Columbia. From 1962 to 1967 he was Alfred P. Sloan Foundation fellow and in 1963 he taught chemistry at University of Pennsylvania. During his 50 years of teaching, he trained 75 Ph.D. students and more than 90 postdoctoral fellows. Between 1955 and 1957 he served in the Royal Air Force. He also published numerous of scientific papers and two books; Behaviour of Electrons in Atoms and Molecular Aspects of Symmetry.

From 1975 to 2012 he was an editor of the scientific journal called Chemical physics. In 1972, he became visiting professor and fellow at Clare College, Cambridge University, England and next year became visiting professor at Australian National University, Canberra. In 1978, he became a Senior Fellow at Alexander von Humboldt Biological Resources Research Institute and the same year became a fellow at American Physical Society. Next year, he became the Director of the University's Regional Laser and Biotechnology Laboratories and in 1980 became visiting professor at LMU Munich.

=== 1980s ===
In 1981, he received Bourke Medal from Faraday Society and a year later became Christianson Fellow at St. Catherine's College, a division of Oxford University. The same year he became a fellow at American Academy of Arts and Sciences. Another two years went by and in 1984 he was awarded an Honorary degree from Scottish Heriot-Watt University. From 1985 to his death he was a chair of the John Scott Advisory Panel for the City of Philadelphia. In 1986, he got Special President's Award from SPIE. Next year, he became associate professor at University of Paris and two years later became Grenoble Professor at the University of Grenoble. The same year he became a fellow at Optical Society of America.

=== 1990s ===
In 1990, he received Philadelphia Section Award and the same year got National Institutes of Health Merit Award. Six years have passed and he received another award, this time it was LICOR Award from University of Nebraska–Lincoln. The next year brought him Ellis Lippincott Award from the Optical Society of America. 1998 brought him two chair positions, one was at the Chemical Physics division of the American Physical Society, the other one was at the Biophysical Chemistry division of American Chemical Society. He was also awarded the E. Bright Wilson Award in Spectroscopy. From 2000 till his death he was an Honorary Professor of Physics at University of Strathclyde.

=== 2000s ===
In 2000, he got Centenary Silver Medal from the Royal Society of Chemistry and three years later received Benjamin Franklin Medal. In 2005, he received F. Albert Cotton Medal from Texas A&M University and in 2007 was awarded A. H. Zewail Award for Ultrafast Science and Technology. Next year, he became an honorary fellow at the Royal Society of Edinburgh and two years later received the Pittsburgh Spectroscopy Award. In 2012, he got even more awards including Linus Pauling Award. He died on 27 February 2013 at the age of 82. After his death, in June 2013 he was posthumously awarded a Doctorate of Science from the University of Edinburgh.
