= Kroupa =

Kroupa (feminine: Kroupová) is a Czech surname. It may refer to:

- Diane Kroupa (born 1955), American federal prisoner, former judge of the United States Tax Court
- Edith Kroupa (1910–1991), research chemist
- Karel Kroupa (born 1950), Czech footballer
- Karel Kroupa, Jr. (born 1980), Czech footballer
- Kateřina Kroupová-Šišková, Czech tennis player
- Melanie Kroupa, publisher of Melanie Kroupa Books
- Patrick K. Kroupa (born 1969), American writer, hacker and activist
- Pavel Kroupa (born 1963), Czech-Australian astrophysicist
- Vlastimil Kroupa (born 1975), Czech ice hockey player
- Zdeněk Kroupa (1921–1999), Czech opera singer
