= Laukien =

Laukien is a surname. Notable people with the surname include:

- Frank Laukien (born 1960), German-American scientist and entrepreneur, son of Günther
- Günther Laukien (1923–1997), German physicist and entrepreneur
  - Günther Laukien Prize
