= Lendl =

Lendl may refer to:

- German name of Lengyel, Hungary
- Lendl (surname)
- Lendl Simmons, a West Indian cricketer

== See also ==
- Landl
