= Bruker =

American scientific instrument manufacturer

Bruker Corporation
- Type: Public
- Traded as: Nasdaq: BRKR; S&P 400 component
- Industry: Scientific test equipment
- Founded: 1960; 66 years ago, in Germany
- Founder: Günther Laukien; Emil Bruker
- Headquarters: Billerica, Massachusetts, U.S.
- Key people: Frank Laukien (chairman, president & CEO)
- Revenue: ▲US$2.96 billion (2023)
- Operating income: ▲US$437 million (2023)
- Net income: ▲US$427 million (2023)
- Total assets: ▲US$4.25 billion (2023)
- Total equity: ▲US$1.39 billion (2023)
- Number of employees: 11,000 (2025)
- Website: bruker.com

Bruker Corporation is an American manufacturer of scientific instruments for molecular and materials research, as well as for industrial and applied analysis. It is headquartered in Billerica, Massachusetts, and is the publicly traded parent company of Bruker Scientific Instruments (Bruker AXS, Bruker BioSpin, Bruker Daltonics and Bruker Optics) and Bruker Energy & Supercon Technologies (BEST) divisions.

In April 2010, Bruker created a Chemical Analysis Division (headquartered in Fremont, CA) under the Bruker Daltonics subsidiary. This division contains three former Varian product lines: ICPMS systems, laboratory gas chromatography (GC), and GC-triple quadrupole mass spectrometer (originally designed by Bear Instruments and acquired by Varian in 2001).

In 2012, it sponsored the Fritz Feigl Prize, and since 1999 the company has also sponsored the Günther Laukien Prize.

== History ==
The company was founded on September 7, 1960, in Karlsruhe, Germany as Bruker-Physik AG by five people, one of them being Günther Laukien, who was a professor at the University of Karlsruhe at the time. The name Bruker originates from co-founder Emil Bruker, as Günther Laukien himself was formally not allowed to commercialize his research whilst being a professor. Bruker produced Nuclear Magnetic Resonance Spectroscopy (NMR) and EMR spectroscopy equipment then.

In the early 1960s, the company had around 60 employees and was growing rapidly. One of the early success products was the HFX 90 NMR spectroscopy system, with three independent channels and which was also the first NMR system using only semiconductor transistors.

In 1969, Bruker launched the first commercial Fourier transform NMR spectroscopy system (FT-NMR) and in the 1970s the company was the first to commercialize a superconducting FT-NMR. Later, the company would expand their product range with MRI, FTIR and FT-Raman spectrometers and with mass spectrometers.

In 1968, Bruker shipped NMR systems to Yale University in Connecticut. After that, demand from the US grew, so Bruker opened an office in Elmsford, New York which marked the start of their US activities. In 2008 after a corporate reorganization lasting 8 years, all divisions were merged in a unified Bruker Corporation.

Günther Laukien died in 1997; one of his four sons Frank Laukien, is currently the CEO of Bruker. Another son, Jörg C. Laukien, also works for the company. Another son, Dirk D. Laukien, is a former company executive.

== Acquisitions ==
Bruker acquisitions include GE NMR Instruments (1992), Siemens AXS (1997), Nonius (2001), MacScience (2002), Vacuumschmelze Hanau (2003), Röntec (2005), SOCABIM (2005), PGT (2005), Keymaster (2006), Quantron (2006), JuWe (2008), SIS (2008), ACCEL (2009), Michrom Bioresources (2011), Skyscan (2012), Prairie Technologies (2013), Oncovision (Preclinical PET imaging business, 2016), Oxford Instruments Superconducting Technology (2016), Hysitron Inc. (2017), XGLab (2017), Luxendo (2017), JPK Instruments (2018), Alicona (2018), PMOD Technologies LLC (2019), Canopy Biosciences (2020), Optimal Group (2022), Neurescence Inc (2022), PhenomeX (2023), MIRO Analytical (majority 2023), NanoString Technologies assets (2024), and ELITechGroup (2024).

=== Other ===
In 1964, the company bought the NMR division of the Swiss Trüb-Täuber. Bruker made several offers to take over its supplier Oxford Instruments during the 1970s, but after almost a decade of negotiations, an acquisition was eventually rejected by Oxford Instruments. In 1997, the analytical X-ray division of Siemens was acquired by Bruker. In 2010, Bruker bought 3 product lines from Agilent, which Agilent had acquired from Varian. These included mass spectrometry and gas chromatography instruments. They have since divested these products to Scion Instruments with the exception of the triple quadrupole In 2012, Bruker bought parts of Carestream Health, including their in-vivo imaging portfolio and related aspects.

In 2019, Bruker bought Alicona, known for production of metrology equipment based on focus variation, to extend its analytics business in the industrial market. In 2020, Bruker acquired Canopy Biosciences. This acquisition allowed Canopy to leverage Bruker's global infrastructure and expertise in product design and engineering. The financial terms of the deal were not disclosed. In November 2022, it was announced Bruker had acquired the Mountain View-headquartered miniaturized microscope / miniscope company, Inscopix, Inc.

== Products ==
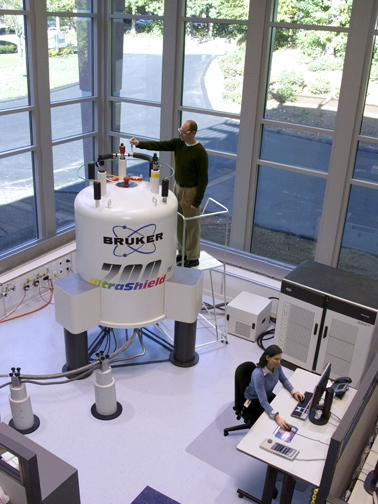

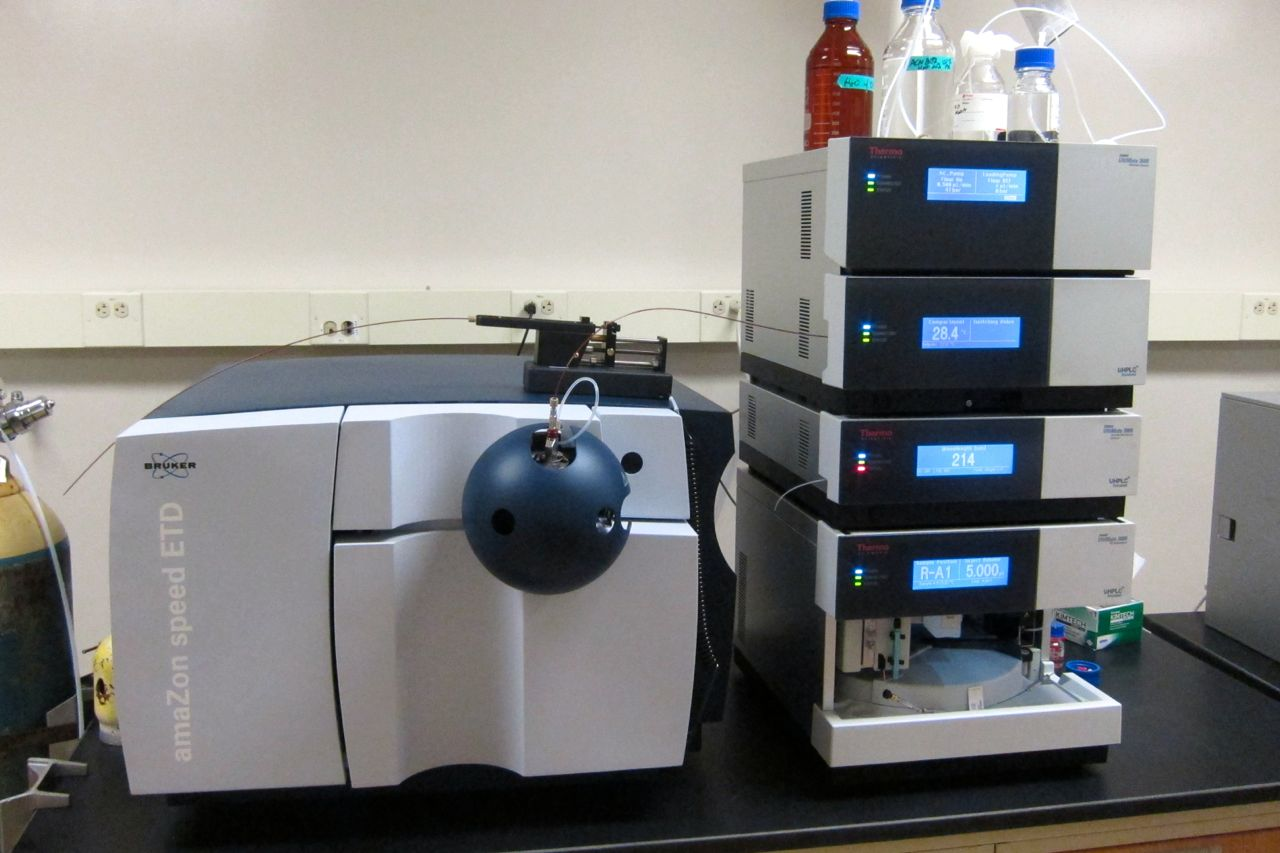
Bruker Amazon Speed ETD ion trap mass spectrometer (left)

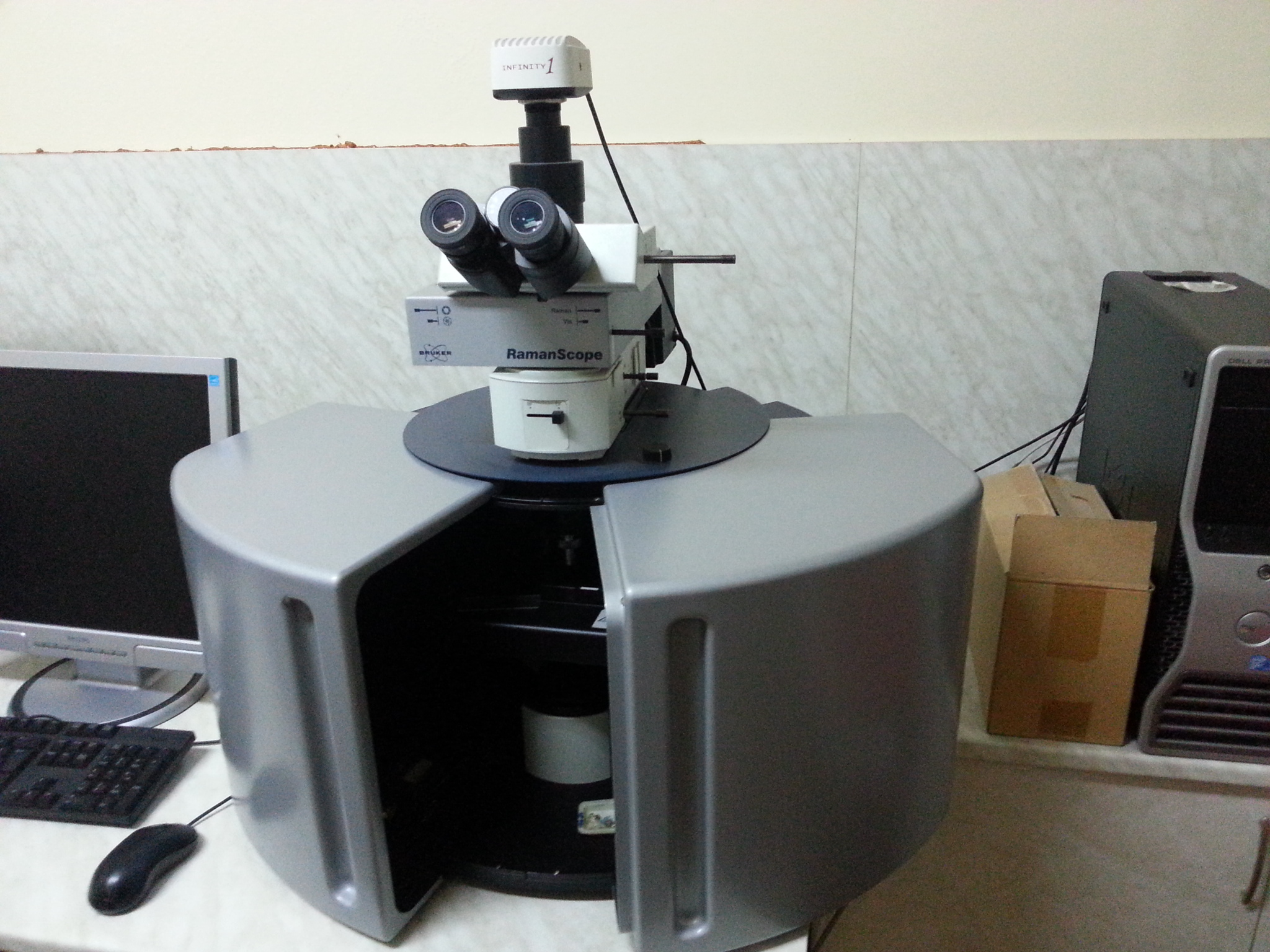
Bruker RamanScope III

Bruker develops and delivers a wide variety of professional and scientific analysis devices including mass spectrometers, single-Crystal and powder X-ray diffractometers, X-ray tomography devices, NMR spectroscopy devices, fluorescence microscopes, raman spectroscopes, atomic-force microscopes, and profilometers.

=== Notable product use ===
Bruker products are used globally in a variety of situations. The National High Magnetic Field Laboratory at Florida State University selected Bruker to build the world's first 21.0 tesla FT-ICR MS.

The Total Carbon Column Observing Network uses high resolution FT-IR spectrometers made by Bruker to measure various greenhouse gases across the globe.

== Awards ==
In May, 2004, Frost & Sullivan selected the Company's Bruker Daltonics subsidiary for their 2004 Product Line Innovation Award for the Life Sciences. Bruker Daltonics received this award for its innovative development of sophisticated mass spectrometers.
