= Cláudio Costa Neto =

Brazilian chemical engineer (born 1932)

- Occupation: Professor emeritus

Academic background
- Education: Federal University of Rio de Janeiro

Academic work
- Discipline: Chemical engineer

Claudio Costa Neto (born Rio de Janeiro, December 11, 1932) is a Brazilian chemical engineer and one of the founders of the Institute of Chemistry at the Federal University of Rio de Janeiro. He is currently a professor emeritus at the Institute of Chemistry of the Federal University of Rio de Janeiro and a titular member of the Brazilian Academy of Sciences.

== History ==
He got his BSc degree in Industrial Chemistry and Chemical Engineering from the University of Brazil (currently the Federal University of Rio de Janeiro) in 1954. From 1953 to 1956, Costa Neto worked under supervision of Fritz Feigl, who was responsible for the development of spot tests for identification and characterization of substances. He created and supported the pioneering shale oil project ("projeto xistoquímica") in Brazil, and characterized the geochemistry of shale oil deposits in the region. He was also responsible for the study of organic geochemistry at UFRJ.

== Books ==
- Costa Neto, Cláudio (2004). Análise orgânica : métodos e procedimentos para caracterização de organoquímios (in Portuguese) (1st ed.). Rio de Janeiro: Ed. UFRJ. ISBN 857108260X.
- Vila Rosário: trilogy about chemistry and society: first part: why and how to eliminate tuberculosis in a society, Claudio Costa Neto, Rio de Janeiro, Calamus Publisher, 480 pages, 2002.
