= Thermomicroscopy =

Thermomicroscopy, developed by the Austrian pharmacognosist Ludwig Kofler (1891-1951) and his wife Adelheid Kofler and continued by Maria Kuhnert-Brandstätter and Walter McCrone, is a method for observing the phases of solid drug substances.
