= ASAC =

ASAC may refer to:

- Administrative Sciences Association of Canada; see Canadian Journal of Administrative Sciences
- ASAC Concorde, a Mauritanean football club
- Airborne Surveillance And Control, a version of the Westland Sea King helicopter
- Assistant Special Agent in Charge, a position in several American federal agencies
- Austrian Society of Analytical Chemistry, the society behind the Fritz Feigl Prize
- Australasian Student Architecture Congress, a meeting of architecture students between Australia, New Zealand, and Papua New Guinea.
