= Seax =

Large knife or small sword wielded by Saxons and their contemporaries

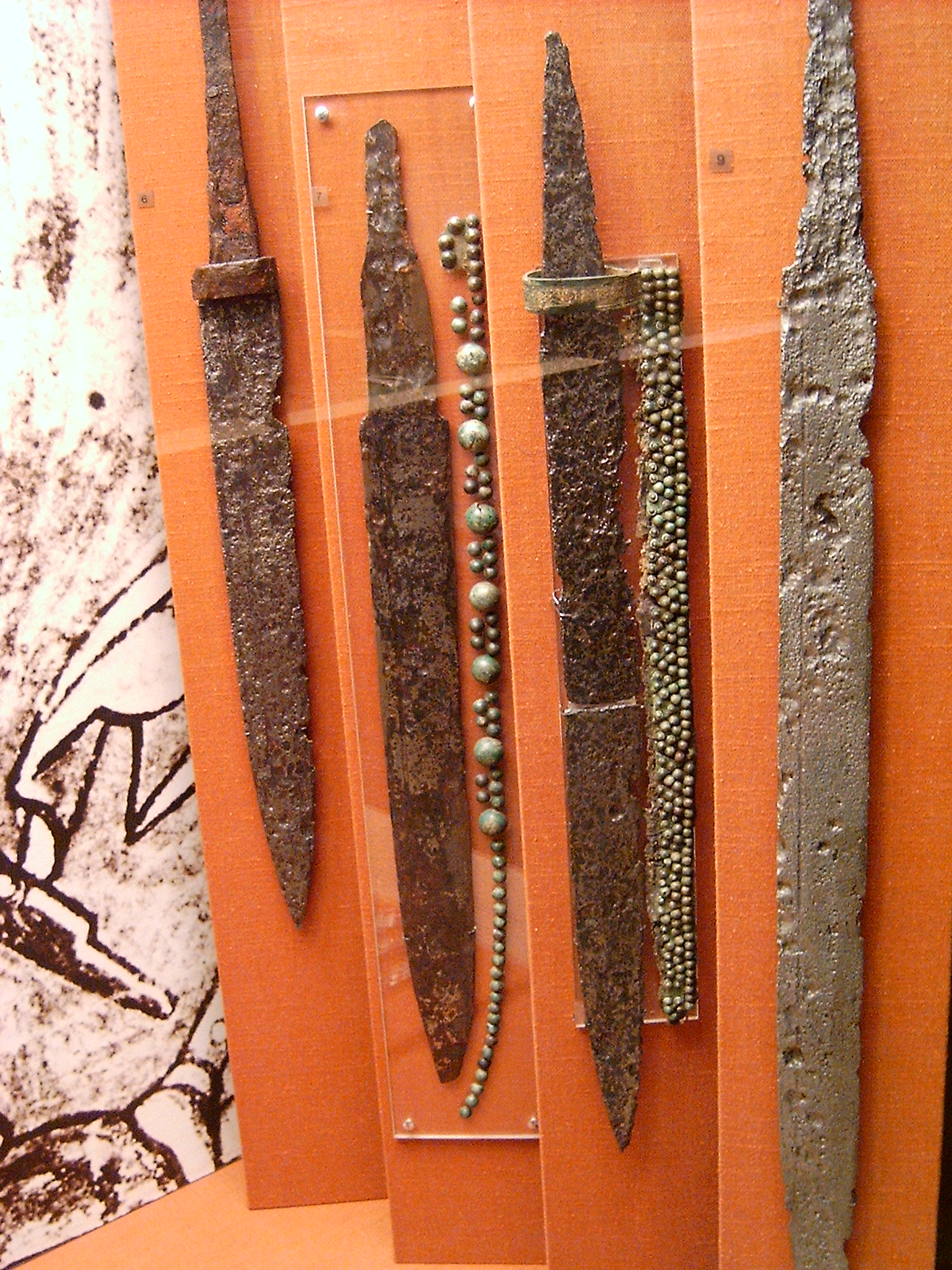
Merovingian seaxes

A seax (Old English pronunciation: [ˈsæɑks]; also sax, sæx, sex; Latinized sachsum) is a small sword, fighting knife or dagger typical of the Germanic peoples of the Migration Period and the Early Middle Ages, especially the Saxons. The name comes from an Old English word for "knife".

In heraldry, the seax is a charge consisting of a curved sword with a notched blade, appearing, for example, in the coats of arms of Essex and the former Middlesex.

== Etymology ==
Old English seax and Old Frisian sax are identical with Old Saxon and Old High German sahs, all from a Common Germanic *sahsą from a root *sah, *sag- "to cut" (also in saw, from a Proto-Indo-European root *sek-). Scramaseax or scramsax (lit. 'wounding-knife') is sometimes used for disambiguation, even though it is not attested in Old English, but taken from an occurrence of scramasaxi in Gregory of Tours' History of the Franks.

The name of the roofer's tool, the zax, is a development from this word.

== Description ==
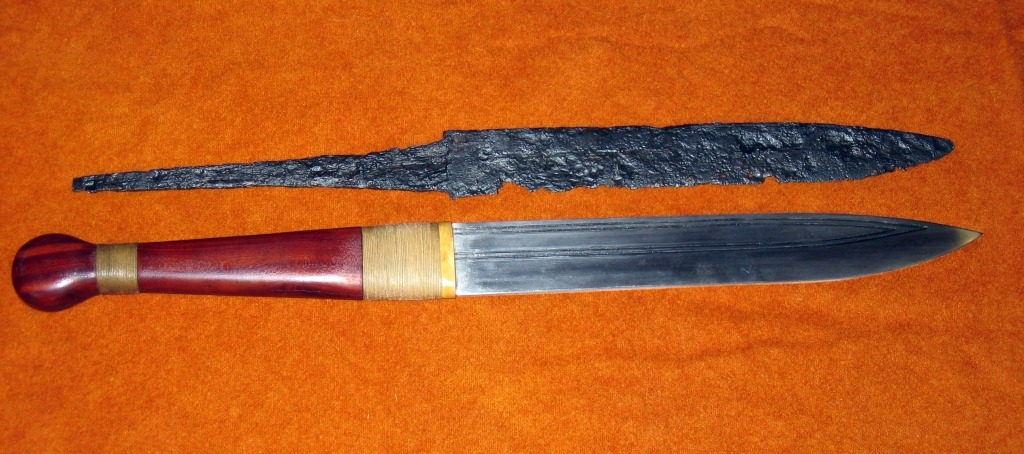
The remains of a seax together with a replica

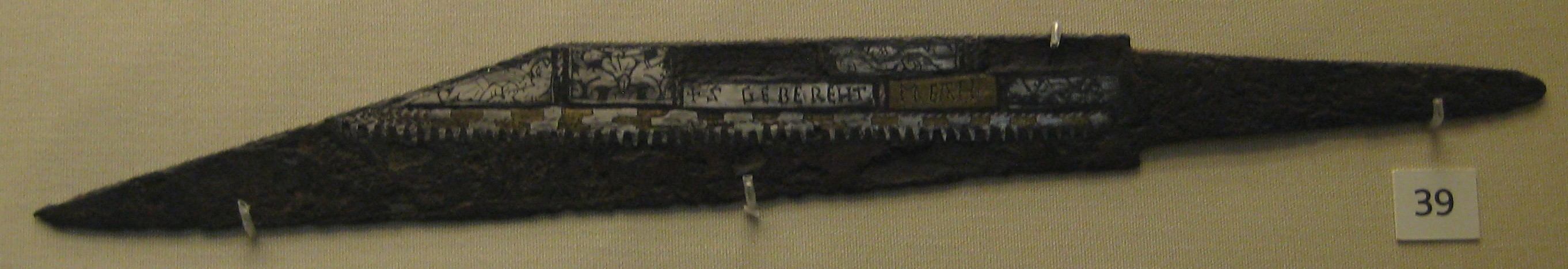
Broken-back seax from Sittingbourne in Kent

Three heraldic seaxes on the flag of Essex

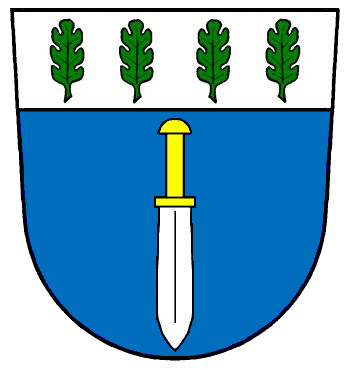
A broad seax on the coat of arms of Eschringen

Amongst the shape and construction of seaxes, there is a great deal of variation. The most frequent characteristics are:

- A tang in the centerline of the blade, inserted into an organic hilt (wood, horn)
- A large single-edged blade
- The blade is worn horizontally inside a scabbard attached to the belt, with the edge of the blade upwards

In the continental Germanic area, the following types are defined for seaxes between roughly 450 and 800 AD, in chronological order:

- Narrow long seax
- Short seax
- Narrow seax – Often have braided bands or snakes engraved in the blade, and frequently include metal bolsters and pommels. Both the edge and the back are curved towards the tip, which is generally located above the centerline of the blade.
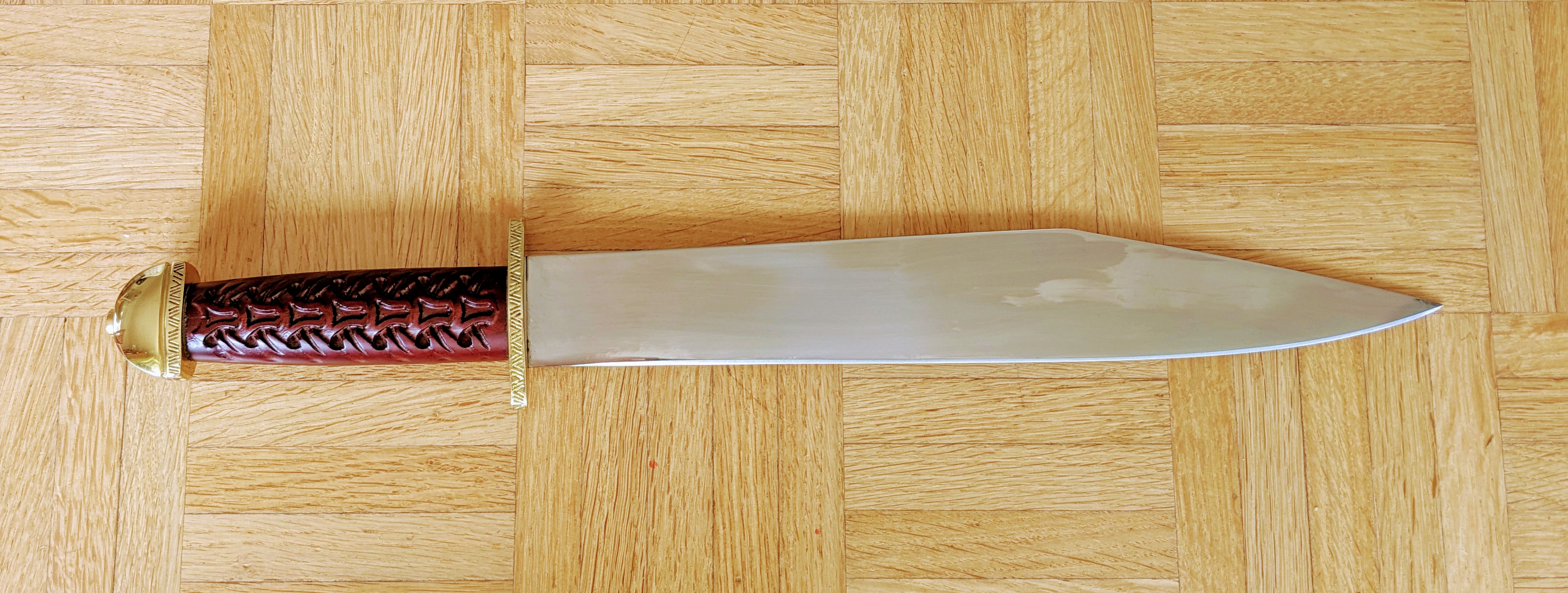
- A modern broken-back seax
  Light broad seax – Similar to narrow seax, but frequently lacks metal hilt parts, and has simpler decorations on the blade, such as parallel lines. Both the edge and the back curve towards the tip, which is generally located at the centerline of the blade.
- Heavy broad seax – Have simple decorations on the blade if any, and long single-part organic hilts (>20 cm (7.9 in)). Both the edge and the back curve towards the tip, which is generally located at the centerline of the blade.
- Atypical broad seax – Same as heavy broad seax.
- Long seax – Blades are 50 cm (20 in) or longer, often with multiple fullers and grooves, pattern welded blades, and long hilts similar to broad seaxes. The edge is generally straight or curved slightly towards the tip. The back either curves gently or with a sharp angle towards the tip, which is located below the centerline of the blade.

The general trend, as one moves from the short to the broad seax, is that the blade becomes heavier, longer, broader, and thicker. Long seaxes, which arrived at the end of the seventh century, were the longest of the seaxes. These were narrower and lighter than their predecessors. Initially, these weapons were found in combination with double-edged swords and were probably intended as a sidearm. From the seventh century onwards, seaxes became the main edged weapon (next to a francisca), sometimes in combination with small side-knives.

The rest of Europe (except for parts of Scandinavia) followed a similar development, although some types may not be prevalent depending on location. In England, long seaxes appear later than on the continent, and finds of long seaxes (as opposed to knives) remain very rare in comparison to finds of swords throughout the period.

Another typical form of the seax is the so-called broken-back style seax. These seaxes have a sharp angled transition between the back section of the blade and the point, the latter generally forming 1/3 to 3/5 of the blade length, exactly like a large version of a modern clip-point blade. These seaxes exist both in long seax variety (edge and back parallel) and in smaller blades of various lengths (blade expanding first, then narrowing towards the tip after the kink). They occurred mostly in the United Kingdom and Ireland, with some examples in Germany around the eighth to eleventh centuries. Some examples have pattern-welded blades, while others have inlays of silver, copper, brass, etc.

== See also ==
- Kragehul lance
- Migration Period spear
- Migration Period sword
- Seax of Beagnoth
