= Fritz Feigl =

Austrian chemist (1891–1971)

- פריץ פייגל
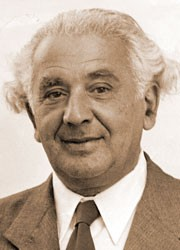
- Born: 15 May 1891; Vienna, Austria-Hungary
- Died: 23 January 1971 (aged 79); Rio de Janeiro, Brazil
- Education: University of Vienna
- Known for: Luminol; Spot analysis
- Awards: Wilhelm Exner Medal (1957); Fritz Pregl Prize (1931); Weizmann Prize (1951)
- Scientific career
- Doctoral advisor: Wilhelm Schlenk
- Doctoral students: Erwin Chargaff; Cláudio Costa Neto

Fritz Feigl (Hebrew: פריץ פייגל; 15 May 1891 – 23 January 1971) was a Jewish Austrian-born chemist. He taught at the Federal University of Rio de Janeiro.

== Biography ==
Feigl was born and studied in Vienna, but owing to his military service in the First World War he had to interrupt his studies. He received his Ph.D. for work with Wilhelm Schlenk in 1920. After his habilitation in 1928 he became a professor at the University of Vienna. He was forced to retire after the Nazi occupation of Austria in 1938.

Feigl was able to get to Belgium and work there. After the occupation of Belgium he was imprisoned in a concentration camp, but was able to reach Portugal and from there Brazil in 1940.

He worked at the University of Rio de Janeiro and became a Brazilian citizen in 1944.

== Contributions ==
Fritz Feigl is the creator of "spot analysis" (spot test), a simple and efficient technique where analytic assays are executed in only one, or a few drops, of a chemical solution, preferably in a great piece of filter paper, without using any sophisticated instrumentation. A notable example he developed was a simple test to know if fishes eaten by Amazon population are contaminated by lead. Poor populations by the Amazon rivers were taught to easily use that technique to find out contaminated fishes and discharge them.

On the occasion of Feigl's 70th birthday the Chemical Society of Midland sponsored a symposium in 1962, attended by 500 scientists from 24 countries, in which all plenary sessions were related on spot tests.

A less known contribution is the development of "luminol", a substance used by forensic investigators to detect the presence of blood, even if the scene has been washed and cleaned.

== Literary works ==
- Qualitative Analyse mit Hilfe von Tüpfelreaktionen, 1931
- Chemistry of specific, selective and sensitive reactions, 1949
- Spot tests in inorganic analysis, 1958
- Spot tests in organic analysis, 1966

== Decorations and awards ==
- 1931: Fritz Pregl Prize
- 1951: Weizmann Prize for Research in the Exact Sciences
- 1956: Honorary doctorate, University of São Paulo
- 1957: Wilhelm Exner Medal
- 1961: Austrian Cross of Honour for Science and Art

== Fritz Feigl Prizes ==
- The Fritz Feigl Prize by the Austrian Society of Analytical Chemistry (ASAC), since 1950.
- In Brazil, since 1996 by the CRQ-IV (4th Regional Chemical Association) the Friz-Feigl Prize tendered (Prêmio Fritz Feigl) to reward and encourage chemists. The winners receive a certificate, a medal and a prize (in 2005 it was 12,000 euros).
