= Fritz Pregl Prize =

Award for achievements in chemistry

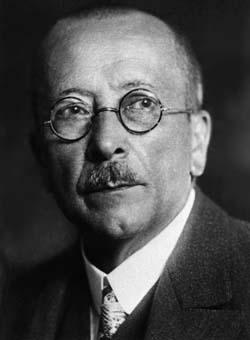
Fritz Pregl

Fritz Pregl Prize has been awarded annually since 1931, to an Austrian scientist for distinguished achievements in chemistry by the Austrian Academy of Sciences (Österreichische Akademie der Wissenschaften) from the funds left at its disposal by the Nobel Prize-winning chemist Fritz Pregl.

Not currently awarded.

== Recipients ==
- 1931 - Fritz Feigl
- 1932 - Moritz Niessner
- 1933 - Anton Benedetti-Pichler
- 1934 - Ludwig Kofler
- 1935 - Edgar Schally
- 1936 - Franz Vieböck
- 1937 - Max Haitinger
- 1938 - Friedrich Hecht
- 1939 - Josef Pirsch
- 1941 - Josef Unterzaucher
- 1942 - Julius Donau
- 1943 - Karl Bürger
- 1947 - Heinz Holter
- 1950 - Hans Lieb
- 1951 - Ernst Wiesen
- 1952 - Georg Gorbach
- 1953 - Ernst Abrahamczik
- 1954 - Adelheid Kofler
- 1955 - Engelbert Broda
- 1956 - Heribert Michl
- 1957 - Herbert Ballczo
- 1958 - Friedrich Kuffner
- 1959 - Gerald Kainz
- 1960 - Hubert Roth
- 1961 - Hans Spitzy
- 1962 - Gerhard Billek
- 1963 - Michael Zacherl
- 1964 - Robert Fischer
- 1965 - Hanns Malissa
- 1966 - Johann Korkisch
- 1967 - Herbert Weisz
- 1969 - Vinzenz Anger
- 1970 - Helmut Trutnovsky
- 1971 - Theodor Leipert
- 1972 - Maria Kuhnert-Brandstätter
- 1973 - Wolfgang Kiesl
- 1974 - Hans Leopold
- 1975 - Erik Lassner
- 1976 - Herbert Sorantin
- 1977 - Robert Kellner
- 1979 - Gottfried Machata
- 1981 - Manfred Grasserbauer
- 1984 - Alexej Nikiforov
- 1986 - Wolfhard Wegscheider
- 1988 - Karl Winsauer
- 1990 - Wolfgang Merz
- 1992 - Hans Malissa
- 1995 - Hans Puxbaum
- 1996 - Ernst Kenndler
- 1998 - Wolfgang Buchberger
- 2000 - Gerhard Sontag
- 2002 - Bernhard Lendl
- 2004 – Erwin Rosenberg and Leopold Jirovetz
- 2006 – Michael Lämmerhofer and Michael Oberhuber

== See also ==
- List of chemistry awards
- Prizes named after people
