= Friedrich Hecht =

Austrian chemist and writer

Friedrich Hecht (3 August 1903, Vienna – 8 March 1980, Vienna) was an Austrian chemist and writer.

Hecht studied chemistry at the University of Vienna, and in 1928 was awarded a PhD. He was an assistant at the Institute of Chemistry. He wrote science fiction under the pseudonym Manfred Langrenus. In 1980, he died in Vienna, Austria.

Even before the Anschluss, in 1933 Hecht was a member of the (at that time illegal) National Socialist German Workers' Party (NSDAP) or Nazi Party and Sturmabteilung or SA, from 1934, the Schutzstaffel or SS.

In 1938, Hecht moved to the Analytical Department of the University of Vienna and achieved habilitation there in 1941. From 1943 to 1950 he was Professor of Microchemistry and Geochemistry at the Graz University of Technology. From 1959-1973, he was Associate Professor of Analytical Chemistry and head of the Analytical Institute in Vienna. At Vienna, Hecht was assisted by Edith Kroupa.

In 1938, Hecht received the Fritz Pregl Prize for distinguished achievements in chemistry by the Austrian Academy of Sciences.

== Novels ==
- Reich im Mond. Utopisch-wissenschaftlicher Roman aus naher Zukunft und jahrmillionenferner Vergangenheit (Empire in the Moon. Utopian-scientific novel of the near future and of a millions of years distant past.), 1951. New edition in 1959 as Reich im Mond. Utopisch-wissenschaftlicher Roman (Empire in the Moon. Utopian-scientific novel).
- Im Banne des Alpha Centauri (Under the spell of the Alpha Centauri). Roman, 1955.
