= Friedrich Johann Karl Becke =

Austrian geologist (1855–1931)

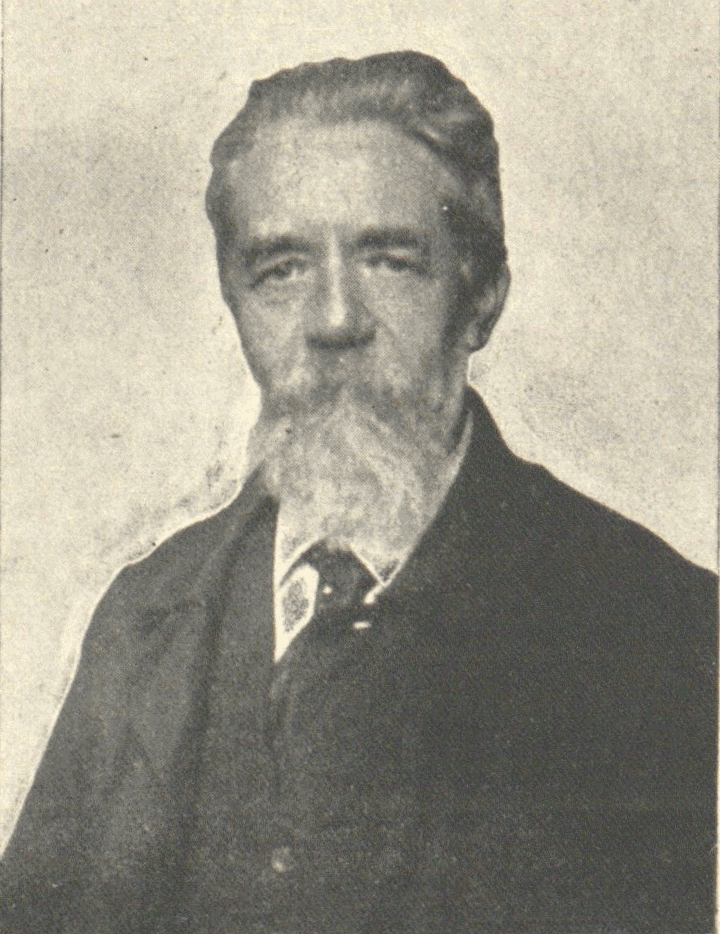
- Born: 31 December 1855; Prague Austria-Hungary
- Died: 18 June 1931 (aged 75); Vienna, Austria
- Known for: Becke line test
- Awards: Wollaston Medal (1929)
- Scientific career
- Doctoral advisor: Gustav Tschermak von Seysenegg

Friedrich Johann Karl Becke (31 December 1855, in Prague – 18 June 1931, in Vienna) was an Austrian mineralogist and petrographer.

== Biography ==
After studying at the University of Vienna, where he specialized in the natural sciences, he became there a lecturer on geology. In 1882 he was appointed professor at the University of Czernowitz. Eight years later he received a similar appointment at Prague, but soon after went to Vienna, where he became professor of mineralogy, succeeding Gustav Tschermak von Seysenegg as such, of whose periodical Mineralogische und Petrographische Mittheilungen he became editor. He published many papers on the science of geology and mineralogy, but he was best known on account of his researches in the field of rock-forming minerals and how they may be determined by means of their light-refractive properties. The results of these studies were published by the Vienna Academy (1893).

His doctoral students include Adelheid Kofler.
