= Fritz Feigl Prize =

The Fritz Feigl Prize (German: Fritz-Feigl-Preis) by the Austrian Society of Analytical Chemistry (ASAC) is named after Fritz Feigl. In 2012 it was sponsored by Bruker Corporation.

== Recipients ==
- Herbert BALLCZO (Wien) 1950
- Gerald KAINZ (Wien) 1950
- Hanns MALISSA sen. (Wien) 1950
- Hans SPITZY (Graz) 1950
- Herbert HABELANDT (Wien) 1951
- Hermengild FLASCHKA (Atlanta) 1953
- Herbert WEISZ (Wien) 1955
- Vinzenz ANGER (Wien) 1961
- Lambert OTTENDORFER (Wien) 1963
- Werner JÜTTE (Wien) 1970
- FRIEDEMANN-BACHLEITNER (Innsbruck) 1970
- Ian MARR (Aberdeen) 1970
- Wolfgang MERZ (Ludwigshafen) 1970
- Hugo ORTNER (Graz) 1970
- Manfred GRASSERBAUER (Wien) 1977
- Anton BURGER (Innsbruck) 1980
- Erich SCHMID (Wien) 1980
- Vasil SIMEONOV (Sofia) 1980
- Wolfhard WEGSCHEIDER (Graz) 1980
- Hans PUXBAUM (Wien) 1987
- Otto WOLFBEIS (Graz) 1987
- Hans MALISSA jun. (Linz) 1987
- Ernst KENNDLER (Wien) 1990
- Matthias OTTO (Freiberg) 1990
- Gerhard STINGEDER (Wien) 1990
- Manfred SCHREINER (Wien) 1993
- Wolfgang BUCHBERGER (Linz) 1993
- Gernot FRIEDBACHER (Wien) 1996
- Günter ALLMAIER (Wien) 1996
- Rudolf KRSKA (Tulln) 2000
- Peter OEFNER (Stanford) 2002
- Bernhard Lendl (Wien) 2003
- Thomas PROHASKA (Wien) 2003
- Boris MIZAIKOFF (Washington) 2004
- Michael LÄMMERHOFER (Wien) 2005
- Walter GÖSSLER (Graz) 2006
- Christian KLAMPFL (Linz) 2007
- Stephan HANN (Wien) 2008
- Herbert OBERACHER (Innsbruck) 2009
- Hanno STUTZ (Salzburg) 2009
- Gunda KÖLLENSPERGER (Wien) 2010
- Peter LIEBERZEIT (Wien) 2011
