= Touchstone (assaying tool) =

Small tablet of dark stone used for assaying precious metal alloys

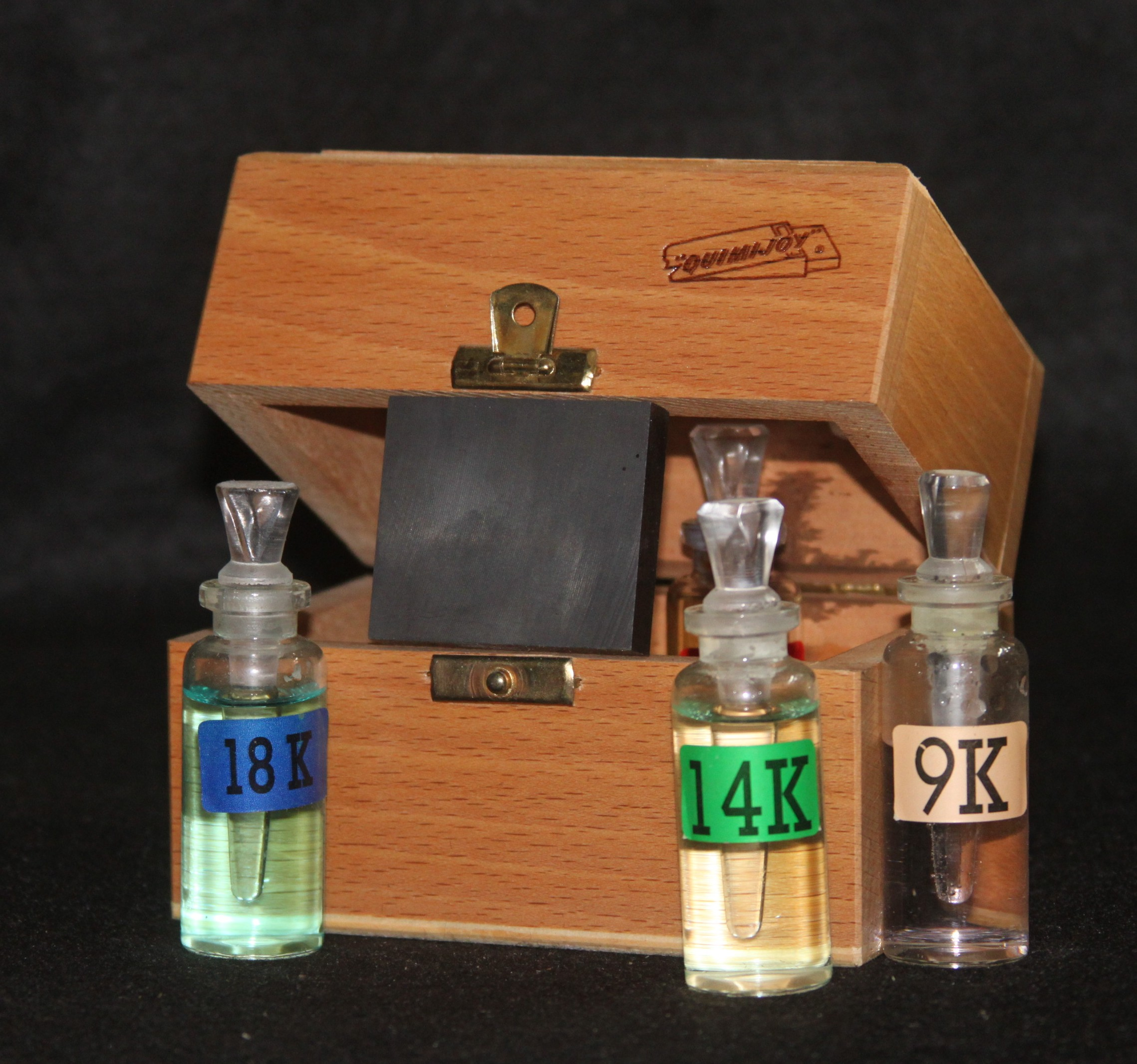
Touchstone set

A touchstone is a small tablet of dark stone such as slate or lydite, used for assaying precious metal alloys. It has a finely grained surface on which soft metals leave a visible trace. Basic requirements for a touchstone: hardness on the mineralogical scale 4.6–6.5, the touchstone must be free of cracks and not react with inorganic acids and their mixtures.

== History ==
The touchstone was used during the Harappa period of the Indus Valley civilization ca. 2600–1900 BC for testing the purity of soft metals. It was also used in Ancient Greece.

The touchstone allowed anyone to easily and quickly determine the purity of a metal sample. This, in turn, led to the widespread adoption of gold as a standard of exchange. Although mixing gold with less expensive materials was common in coinage, using a touchstone one could easily determine the quantity of gold in the coin, and thereby calculate its intrinsic worth.

== Operation ==
Drawing a line with gold on a touchstone will leave a visible trace. Because different alloys of gold have different colors (see gold), the unknown sample can be compared to samples of known purity. This method has been used since ancient times. In modern times, additional tests can be done. The trace will react in different ways to specific concentrations of nitric acid or aqua regia, thereby identifying the quality of the gold: 24 karat gold is not affected but 14 karat gold will show chemical activity.

== See also ==
- Litmus test
- Spot analysis
- Streak test
