= Lendl (surname) =

Lendl is a surname. Notable people with the surname include:

- Bernhard Lendl, Austrian chemist
- Isabelle Lendl (born 1991), American golfer
- Ivan Lendl (born 1960), Czech tennis player
