= Kofler bench =

Molecular temperature measurement tool

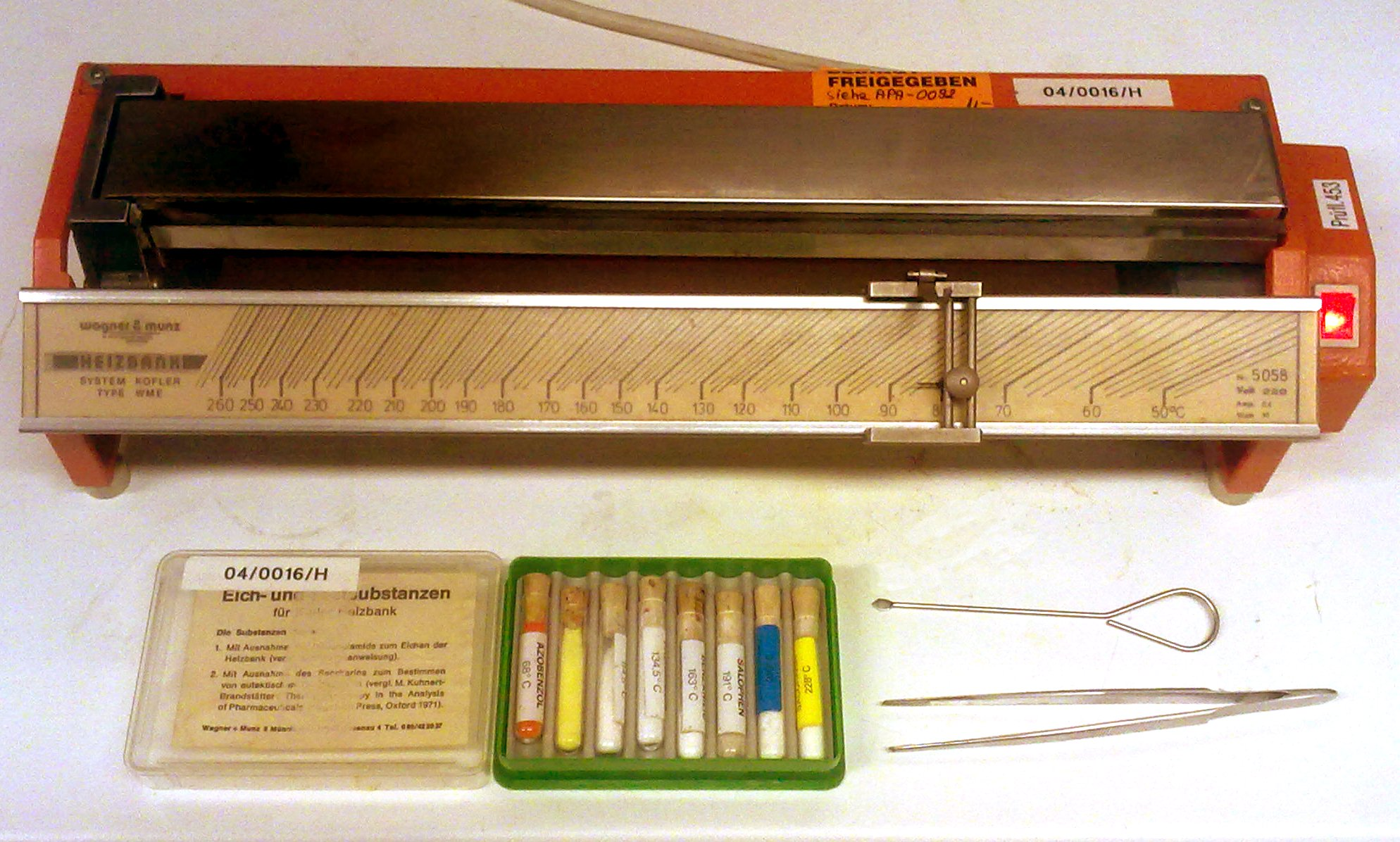
Kofler bench with samples for calibration

A Kofler bench, or Kofler heating bar; Kofler hot bar; Kofler hot bench, in German, Kofler-Heizbank, is a metal strip with a temperature gradient (range room temperature to 300°C). Any substance can be placed on a section of the strip revealing its thermal behaviour at the temperature at that point. The gradient is engineered to be approximately linear.

This melting-point apparatus for use with a microscope was developed by the Austrian pharmacognosist Ludwig Kofler (30 November 1891 Dornbirn - 23 August 1951 Innsbruck) and his wife mineralogist Adelheid Kofler. In 1936, the Koflers and Mayrhofer published their "Mikroskopische Methoden in der Mikrochemie" [Kofler, L., A. Kofler and Mayrhofer, A. (1936)], Kofler and Kofler published their "Thermomikromethoden" [Kofler L., and A. Kofler (1954)] in 1954. The integration of microscope and Kofler bench is known as the Kofler hot stage microscope.

Kofler, his wife Adelheid, and their colleague, Maria Kuhnert-Brandstätter, investigated numerous organic molecules, and published some 250 papers describing their work.

Thermomicroscopy, incepted by Ludwig and Adelheid Kofler and developed further by Maria Kuhnert-Brandstätter (1919–2011) and Walter C. McCrone used the technique for studying the phases of solid drug substances.

== See also ==
- Melting point
