= Frank Laukien =

German-American billionaire businessman and scientist

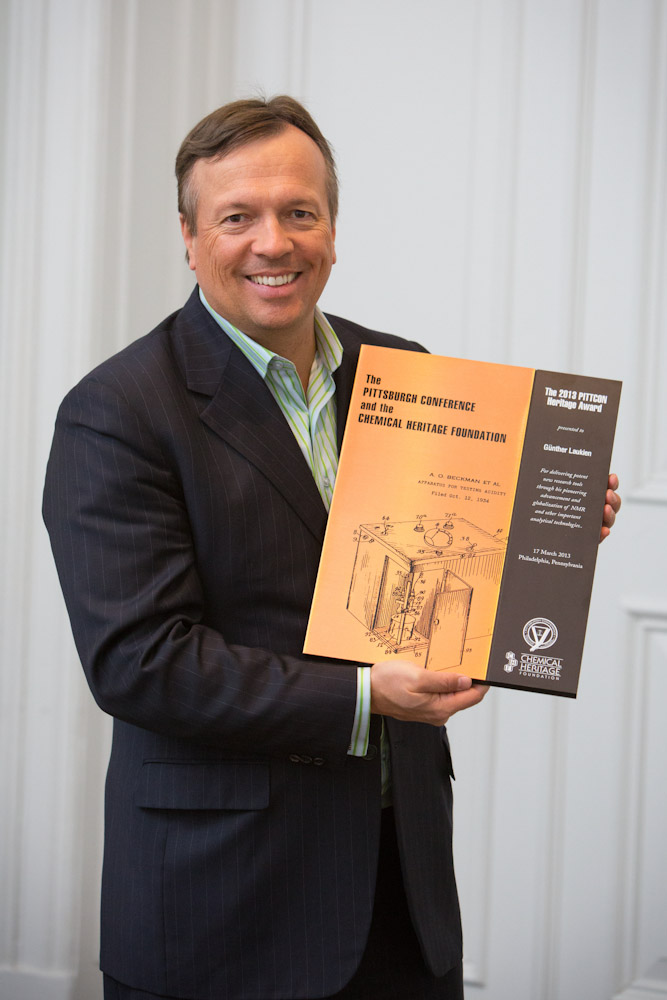
- Laukien in 2013
- Born: Frank H. Laukien; 1960 (age 65–66); Stuttgart, Germany
- Education: Massachusetts Institute of Technology (BS); Harvard University (PhD)
- Occupation: Businessman
- Title: Chairman and CEO, Bruker
- Parent: Günther Laukien

Frank H. Laukien (born 1960) is a German-American billionaire businessman and scientist, and president and CEO of Bruker since 2008. As of February 2023, his net worth is estimated at US$2.6 billion.

== Early life ==
Frank Laukien is the son of Günther Laukien, the founder of Bruker. His mother Dr. Rose Laukien was a German high-school (Gymnasium) teacher in German literature, English and History. In 1984 he earned a bachelor's degree from Massachusetts Institute of Technology, and a PhD in chemical physics from Harvard University in 1988.

== Career ==
In the 1990s, Laukien was a lecturer in NMR and mass spectrometry at the University of Bremen, Germany, and a part-time professor at the Institute of Mass Spectrometry of the University of Amsterdam, Netherlands. He has previously served on the Dean's Advisory Committee of the School of Science of MIT, and on the Board of the Analytical, Life Science & Diagnostics Association (ALDA), including one year as chairman. In 2017, he has been elected a senator of acatech, the German natural science and engineering academy.

Laukien owns 24% of Bruker. As of October 2020, Forbes estimated his net worth at US$1.5 billion.

== Cancer evolution ==
Laukien was the lead organizer of the Cancer & Evolution Symposium in Boston, US in October 2020. This led to the formation of the AACR Cancer Evolution Working Group, of which Laukien is joint co-chair with Charles Swanton.

== Publications ==
Active Biological Evolution: Feedback-Driven, Actively Accelerated Organismal and Cancer Evolution , Frank H. Laukien, 2022 ISBN 979-8-9854147-0-7

Origins & Evolution: Evolution of Our Universe and Planet, and the Origins of Life and Meaning Frank H. Laukien, ISBN 979-8985414721

== Personal life ==
Laukien is married, and lives in Boston, US.
