= Adelheid Kofler =

Austrian inventor, mineralogist, and ophthalmologist

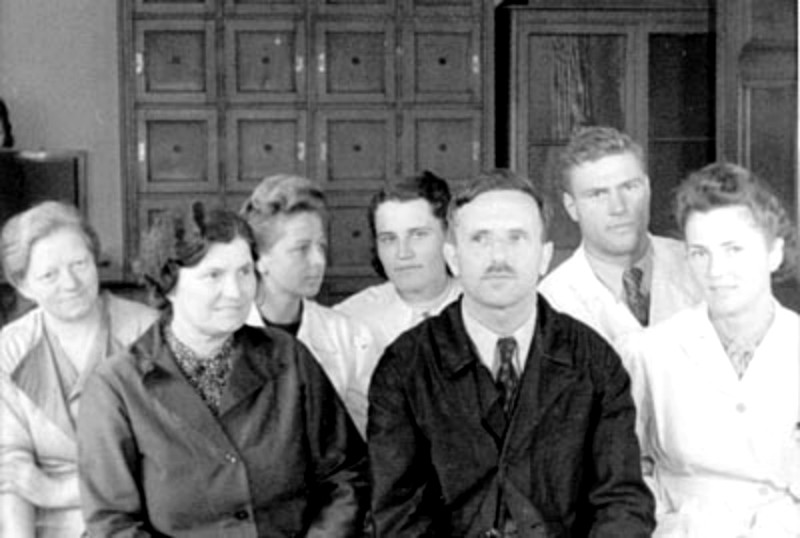
- Adelheid and Ludwig Kofler (front) c. 1940
- Born: Adelheid Schaschek; 24 June 1889; Haugsdorf, Austria
- Died: 27 July 1985 (aged 96); Innsbruck, Austria
- Education: University of Vienna, Ph.D., M.D.
- Occupations: Inventor, mineralogist, and ophthalmologist
- Known for: Thermomicroscopy; Kofler bench
- Spouse: Ludwig Kofler
- Children: Two sons and one daughter
- Awards: Fritz Pregl Prize (1954)

Adelheid Kofler née Schaschek (24 June 1889, Haugsdorf – 27 July 1985, Innsbruck) was an Austrian inventor, mineralogist, and ophthalmologist. She was among the early women to receive both Ph.D. and M.D. degrees from the University of Vienna.

== Biography ==
After attending public school in Amstetten, Lower Austria, Adelheid Schaschek she studied from 1903 to 1907 at the municipal girls' lyceum in Brno, Czech Republic. From 1907 to 1911, she studied at the University of Vienna. In 1911, she passed the teaching examination, which qualified her to teach mathematics, natural history, and physics to female students at lyceums. In 1912, she passed a further examination, qualifying her to teach at teacher training institutions and higher schools for girls. She subsequently taught at the girls' lyceum in the Viennese district of Mariahilf.

Under the direction of Friedrich Johann Karl Becke, she completed her doctoral dissertation on mineralogy and received her Ph.D. from the University of Vienna in 1913. Beginning in 1917, she studied medicine at the same university, earning her M.D. in 1921 and specializing in ophthalmology.

In 1921, she married the pharmacologist Ludwig Kofler (1891–1951) in Vienna.

In 1925, Adelheid Kofler moved with her family to Innsbruck. From the early 1930s, she assisted her husband in his research at the University of Innsbruck's pharmacognostics institute. Applying her knowledge of mineralogy, she conducted studies on the behavior of mixed crystals during melting and crystallization. Together with her husband, she developed the Kofler hot microscope (thermomicroscope) and the Kofler hot bench. Much of her research focused on polymorphism, collaborating with fellow researcher, Maria Kuhnert-Brandstätter.

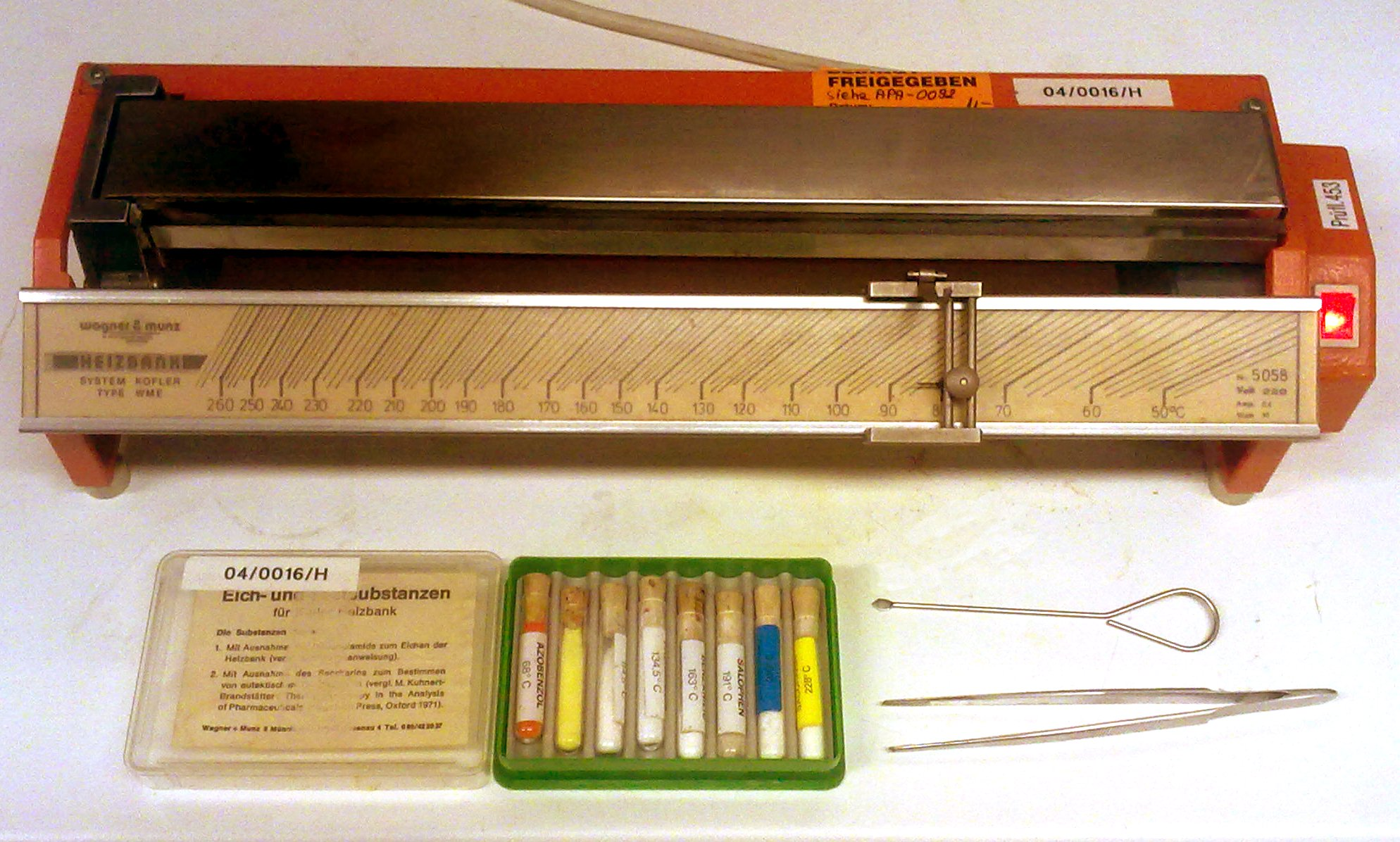
Kofler hot bench with samples for calibration.

The joint research conducted by the Koflers combined their respective academic strengths.

Ludwig next reported a method for determining refractive index using his hot stage: the unknown would be mixed with a few fragments of one of 23 different grades of glass; these vanished when the refractive index of glass and melt matched. Developing these ideas further, the Koflers devised a microscale version of the Rast molecular weight method, with camphor and the unknown together on the heated stage. Then Adelheid put two substances side-by-side on the stage and could both watch them melt separately and observe their interaction at the interface. This led to studies of co-crystals and eutectics. Photomicrographs illustrate these magnificent papers.

They had a daughter, Erika (1922–2012), and two sons, Helmut and Walter (born 1928). Walter collaborated on research with his father in the late 1940s and early 1950s. Ludwig Kofler died by suicide in 1951.

== Awards and honors ==
- 1954 — Fritz Pregl Prize
- 1980 — Österreichischen Ehrenkreuze für Wissenschaft und Kunst, 1st class

== Selected publications ==
- Kofler, Adelheid (1936). "Mikroskopische Untersuchung der Mutterkornalkaloide. I. Ergotamin und Ergotaminin". Archiv der Pharmazie. 274 (7): 398–414. doi:10.1002/ardp.19362740704. S2CID 95745507. (Microscopic investigations of the ergot alkaloids I. Ergotamine and Ergotamine)
- Kofler, Ludwig; —— (1940). "Der Mischschmelzpunkt unter dem Mikroskop". Angewandte Chemie. 53 (37–38): 434–435. Bibcode:1940AngCh..53..434K. doi:10.1002/ange.19400533708.
- —— (1942). "Über die Isodimorphie von β-Naphthol und Naphthalin". Berichte der Deutschen Chemischen Gesellschaft (A and B Series). 75 (8): 998–1001. doi:10.1002/cber.19420750812.
- —— (1943). "Zur Polymorphie organischer Stoffe: Acridin, Brenzcatechin, Diphenylamin und Korksäure". Berichte der Deutschen Chemischen Gesellschaft (A and B Series). 76 (9): 871–873. doi:10.1002/cber.19430760906. (Polymorphism of organic substances: acridine, catechol, diphenylamine and suberic acid)
- —— (1943). "Mikro-Thermoanalyse organischer Zweistoffsysteme". Die Naturwissenschaften. 31 (47–48): 553–557. Bibcode:1943NW.....31..553K. doi:10.1007/BF01469010. S2CID 32579999.
- —— (1950). "Hydrate unter dem Heizmikroskop". Chemische Berichte. 83 (6): 594–599. doi:10.1002/cber.19500830616.
- —— (1951). "Zur Kenntnis der Hexachlor-cyclohexane und ihrer Gemische, I. Mitteil.: Polymorphie". Chemische Berichte. 84 (4): 376–381. doi:10.1002/cber.19510840406.
- Kofler, L.; —— (1954). Thermo-Mikro-Methoden zur Kennzeichnung organischer Stoffe und Stoffgemische (enlarged, 3rd ed.). Verlag Chemie. (Micro-Methods for the Identification of Organic Substances and Mixtures of Substances; 1st edition, 1945; 2nd edition, 1948)
- —— (1955). "Mikrothermoanalyse des Systems NaNO_{3}-KNO_{3}". Monatshefte für Chemie und Verwandte Teile Anderer Wissenschaften. 86 (4): 643–652. doi:10.1007/BF00902291.
