= Melanie Kroupa Books =

Melanie Kroupa Books was an imprint at:

- Orchard Books (1992-1996)
- DK Ink (1996-2000)
- Farrar, Straus and Giroux Books for Young Readers (2000-2008)
