= Gunda Köllensperger =

Austrian chemist and academic

- Education: Technical University of Vienna
- Scientific career
- Workplaces: University of Natural Resources and Life Sciences, Vienna; Humboldt University
- Thesis: Investigation of small particles by scanning force microscopy (1998)
- Website: Köellensperger Lab

Gunda Köllensperger is an Italian chemist and professor of chemistry at the University of Vienna. She investigates metallobiomolecules and drugs using inductively coupled plasma mass spectrometry. She was awarded the 2023 Houska Prize for her prize in Analytical Chemistry.

== Early life and education ==
Köllensperger was an undergraduate student at the Technical University of Vienna where she used laser-based approaches for mass spectrometry. She remained there as a doctoral student, where she studied small particles using scanning force microscopy.

== Research and career ==
Köllensperger joined the University of Natural Resources and Life Sciences, BOKU, as an assistant professor. She completed her habilitation in analytical chemistry on inductively coupled plasma mass spectrometry. She was promoted to associate professor in 2003. In 2011 she moved to the Austrian Centre for Industrial Biotechnology, where she led the facility in metabolomics. In 2014 Köllensperger was made Professor of Environmental Chemistry at the University of Vienna. She was made Head of the Institute of Analytical Chemistry in 2016.

Köllensperger works alongside the Medical University of Vienna to improve the diagnosis and treatment of cancer patients. Metal-based chemotherapies offer routes to precise and targeted cancer therapies, but do not always achieve positive outcomes and can result in side effects. She is interested in the fate and impact of platinum-based compounds and the identification of strategies to manipulate the tumour environment. Anticancer platinum-based compounds have traditionally caused damage because they are toxic to healthy human tissue. Köllensperger and co-workers showed that it would be possible to attach two moieties to direct the compounds to the malignant tissue. These anticancer drugs bind to the blood protein albumin, which is degraded by the tumour but less by health cells, and release in the malignant tissues beside cytotoxic chemotherapy.

She developed U13C-isotopically labelled biomass extracts as a standardisation tool for metabolomics. The integration of isotopically enriched biomass was shown to increase analytical throughput.

== Awards and honours ==
- 2001: BOKU Preis der Wiener Wirtschaftskammer
- 2010: Austrian Society of Analytical Chemistry Fritz Feigl Award
- 2015: Fellinger Krebsforschung Award
- 2016: Fonds der Stadt Wien für innovative interdisziplinäre Krebsforschung Award
- 2017: Prize Lipidome Isotope Labeling of Yeast
- 2023: Houska Prize
- 2024: Analytical Scientist Power List - Instrumental Innovators

== Select publications ==
- Carlos Guijas; J. Rafael Montenegro-Burke; Xavier Domingo-Almenara; et al. (2018). "METLIN: A Technology Platform for Identifying Knowns and Unknowns". Analytical Chemistry. 90 (5): 3156–3164. doi:10.1021/acs.analchem.7b04424. PMC 5933435. PMID 29381867. Wikidata Q47554803.
- Walter J Fitz; Walter W Wenzel; Hao Zhang; et al. (2003). "Rhizosphere characteristics of the arsenic hyperaccumulator Pteris vittata L. and monitoring of phytoremoval efficiency". Environmental Science & Technology. 37 (21): 5008–5014. doi:10.1021/es0300214. PMID 14620831. Wikidata Q79298582.
- Petra Heffeter; Katharina Böck; Bihter Atil; et al. (2010). "Intracellular protein binding patterns of the anticancer ruthenium drugs KP1019 and KP1339". Journal of Biological Inorganic Chemistry. 15 (5): 737–748. doi:10.1007/s00775-010-0642-1. PMC 3371400. PMID 20221888. Wikidata Q42040747.
