= Bernhard Lendl =

Austrian chemist

Bernhard Lendl is an Austrian chemist, TU Vienna, Institute of Chemical Technologies and Analytics, the head of the working group on Process Analysis & Vibrational Spectroscopy. Since 2001 he is professor of analytical chemistry, TU Vienna.

His interests include infrared and Raman spectroscopy lab-on-a-chip systems.

== Recognition ==
- 2002: Fritz Pregl Prize, Austrian Academy of Sciences
- 2003: Fritz Feigl Prize of the Austrian Society of Analytical Chemistry
- 2011: FACSS Innovation Award (shared with colleagues) for the paper, C. Koch, M. Brandstetter, S. Radel, and B.Lendl, "Ultrasound Enhanced ATR mid-IR Fibre Optic Probe for Spectroscopy of Particles in Suspensions," which presented a new method for online monitoring of fermentation based on mid-infrared spectroscopy.
- 2011: Society for Applied Spectroscopy Fellows Award
- 2021: Thought Leader Award of Agilent Technologies
