= Miro Analytical =

Company description of MIRO Analytical

MIRO Analytical
- Company type: Corporation
- Industry: Test and measurement
- Founded: 2018
- Founder: Morten Hundt, PhD; Oleg Aseev, PhD
- Headquarters: Zurich, Switzerland
- Products: MGA Multi-compound Gas Analyzers, Isotopic analyzers
- Website: miro-analytical.com

MIRO Analytical is a Swiss manufacturer of laser-based gas analyzers and isotope analyzers.

The company is based in Zurich, Switzerland and was founded 2018.

== History ==
MIRO Analytical is a spin-off of Empa, a Swiss research institute of the ETH domain. It has know-how in laser spectroscopy and in particular, in the combination of several quantum-cascade lasers (QCLs) into compact laser-based gas analyzers.

The company's first instrument was a nine gas analyzer MGA-9 in 2018. By 2019 the MGA-10 a ten gas analyzer was introduced which measures greenhouse gases and air pollutants.

== Technology ==
The gas analyzers directly measure concentrations of multiple gas species using mid-infrared laser absorption spectroscopy with QCLs as light sources. This allows for highly specific and accurate gas detection along with maximum measurement sensitivity.

== See also ==
- Infrared spectroscopy
