= Edith Kroupa =

Austrian chemist

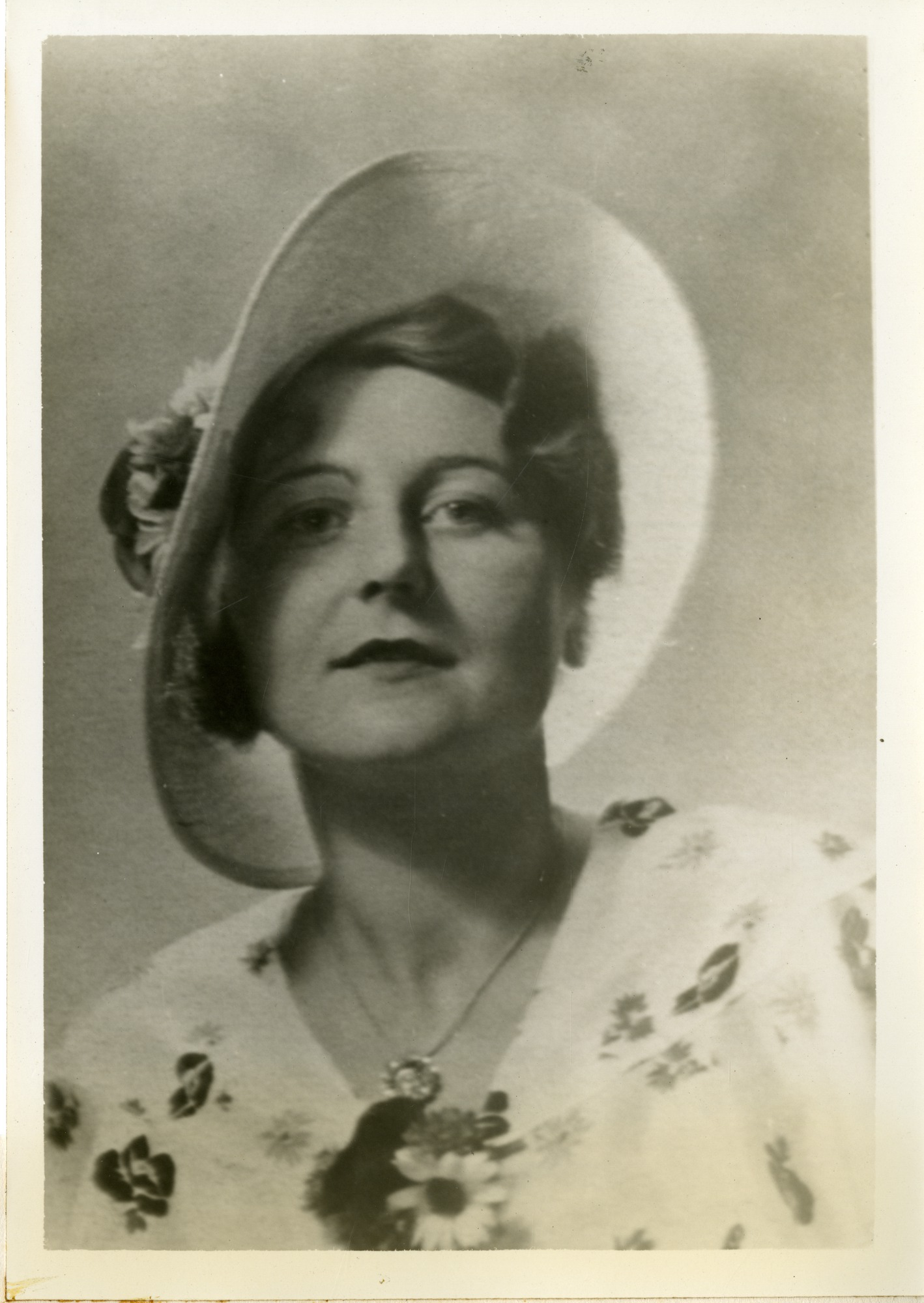
- Edith Kroupa, 1934
- Born: 1910
- Died: 1991 (aged 80–81)
- Education: University of Vienna
- Spouse: Hugo Karl
- Scientific career
- Fields: Chemistry
- Workplaces: Monsanto Company

Edith Kroupa (1910–1991) was a research chemist who utilized microchemical analysis in the laboratory of Professor A. Franke at the University of Vienna. In 1930, Kroupa and Friedrich Hecht analyzed a sample of radioactive rock from the Huron Claim, Manitoba near Winnipeg, Manitoba, Canada. The team determined the sample to be over 1,725,000,000 years old.

== Monsanto ==
In 1934, Editha Karl-Kroupa Kroupa, who was an Austrian research chemist worked with a new method of microchemical analysis in the laboratory of Prof. A. Franke at the University of Vienna, analyzed a sample of radioactive rock from near Winnipeg, Canada. | Kroupa emigrated to the United States in the 1950s. According to US Customs records, on 3 June 1953, Editha Karl-Kroupa, age 43 and Hugo Karl, age 43, arrived at New York City, New York, and listed a local address as the Hotel Almac on Broadway and 71st Street in New York City. The couple embarked from Bremerhaven, Germany on 26 May 1953 aboard the USNS General Alexander M. Patch (T-AP-122) and traveled in Cabin Class. They arrived in New York on 3 June 1953 and presented Austrian passports to US Customs officials. The couple traveled with 6 pieces of baggage.

Kroupa worked as a chemist in the Inorganic Chemicals Research Division for the Monsanto Company, in Dayton, Ohio, where her research focused on phosphates.

== Triple-weight hydrogen ==
- Giauque, W. F., & Johnston, H. L. (1928). Symmetrical and antisymmetrical hydrogen and the third law of thermodynamics. Thermal equilibrium and the triple point pressure. Journal of the American Chemical Society, 50(12), 3221-3228.
- Urey, H. C., Brickwedde, F. G., & Murphy, G. M. (1932). A hydrogen isotope of mass 2. Physical Review, 39(1), 164.
- Urey, H. C., Brickwedde, F. G., & Murphy, G. M. (1932). A hydrogen isotope of mass 2 and its concentration. Physical Review, 40(1), 1.
- Urey, H. C. (1933). The separation and properties of the isotopes of hydrogen. Science, 78(2034), 566-571.
- Davis, W. (1934). Hydrogen's Heavy Twin Has Already Had Romantic Life. The Science News-Letter, 324-325.
- Science Service Staff. (1934). Science Strides Forward. The Science News-Letter, 388-400.
- Sueltz, B. A. (1934). The Diffraction of Light, X-Rays and Material Particles, by Charles F. Meyer, Associate Professor of Physics, University of Michigan.
- Lawrence, E. O. (1939). Atoms, new and old. In Science in Progress (Vol. 1, p. 18). Yale University Press New Haven.

== Publications ==
- Hecht, F., & Kroupa, E. (1935). Eine Methode zur Analyse sehr kleiner Monazitmengen. Zeitschrift für analytische Chemie, 102(3-4), 81-99.
- Hecht, F., & Kroupa, E. (1936). Die Bedeutung der quantitativen Mikroanalyse radioaktiver Mineralien für die geologische Zeitmessung. Fresenius' Journal of Analytical Chemistry, 106(3), 82-103.
- Kroupa, E. (1938). Mikrogravimetrische Trennung von Nickel und Uran. Microchimica Acta, 3(4), 306-312.
- Kroupa, E., & Hecht, F. (1938). Die Bestimmung von Blei, Thorium und Uran in Allaniten zum Zweck geologischer Zeitmessung. Zeitschrift für anorganische und allgemeine Chemie, 236(1), 181-199.
- Kroupa, E. (1939). Geologische Zeitmessung durch Monazitanalyse. Mikrochemie vereinigt mit Mikrochimica acta, 27(3), 165-175.
- Kroupa, E. (1939). Mikrogravimetrische Trennung von Zink und Uran. Mikrochemie vereinigt mit Mikrochimica acta, 27(1-2), 1-7.
- Cimerman, C., Wenger, P., Kroupa, E., Rây, P. R., & Sarkar, T. C. (1941). Mikroanalyse von Zink. Fresenius' Journal of Analytical Chemistry, 122(5), 216-224.
- Hecht, F., Kroupa, E., & Koss-Rosenqvist, I. T. (1941). Beiträge zur Mikro-Mineralanalyse. Mikrochemie vereinigt mit Mikrochimica acta, 29(1-2), 94-99.
- Fresenius, R., & Kroupa, E. (1941). Über die Bestimmung von Kieselsäure und Fluor in Mineralwasser. Fresenius' Journal of Analytical Chemistry, 121(3), 138-139.
- Kroupa, E. (1944). Mikrogravimetrische Trennung von Vanadin und Uran mit nachfolgender Bestimmung des Vanadins als Silberorthovanadat. Mikrochemie vereinigt mit Mikrochimica acta, 32(3-4), 245-251.
- Kroupa, E. (1947). Äußerst empfindliche Mikro-Krystallisationsreaktionen für freies und gebundenes Wismut und Antimon. Fresenius' Journal of Analytical Chemistry, 128(1), 88-89.
