= Günther Laukien =

German physicist and entrepreneur

Günther Laukien (23 May 1923, in Eschringen (Saarland) – 29 April 1997, in Karlsruhe) was a German physicist and entrepreneur. He is known for his pioneering work in nuclear magnetic resonance spectroscopy and for his role in the Bruker company.

== Early life ==
Laukien was born in 1924 in the German village of Eschringen in the Saarland. He finished high school in 1942 – during World War II – and joined the German Navy as a submarine engineer after his graduation. After the war ended in 1945, he studied physics at the University of Tübingen, from which he received his undergraduate degree in 1951.

== Academic career ==
In 1955 he graduated on the "experimental aspects of nuclear magnetic resonance" at the University of Stuttgart. This was done under professor Hans Otto Kneser. He wrote his doctoral thesis on "Freie Präzession kernmagnetischer Momente" (Free precession of nuclear magnetic moments). His thesis already explored the techniques behind nuclear magnetic resonance spectroscopy, at a time when this was not developed yet. Only a couple of earlier papers had explored this subject, and Laukien was most likely unknown with those papers. After getting his PhD, he became "Oberassistent" and in 1957 he achieved habilitation. In 1958 he moved from Stuttgart to the University of Karlsruhe, where he became a professor in 1960. In 1968 he became a life-time professor in electronics at Ruhr University Bochum In 1980 Günther Laukien received the ISMAR prize, which is awarded for outstanding achievement in the field of magnetic resonance. In 2013 he posthumously received the Pittcon Heritage Award for his contributions to the development of nuclear magnetic resonance and other analytical technologies.

== Bruker ==
In 1960 he co-founded and soon chaired the Bruker spectroscopy company (then named Bruker-Physik AG), which was specialized in designing and using electromagnets, with applications in nuclear magnetic resonance spectroscopy. Until his death, Laukien was actively involved in both research and business aspects of the company.

== Personal life ==
Laukien had four sons who were all involved in Bruker.

Developing underwater equipment was one of his hobbies.

He died in 1997 of cancer, aged 73.
