= Spot analysis =

Chemical test

Spot analysis, spot test analysis, or a spot test is a chemical test, a simple and efficient technique where analytic assays are executed in only one, or a few drops, of a chemical solution, preferably in a great piece of filter paper, without using any sophisticated instrumentation. The development and popularization of the test is credited to Fritz Feigl.

Spot test or spot assay can also refer to a test often used in microbiology.

== Chemistry ==
The foundations of Feigl's work on spot analysis were the works of Hugo Schiff (the earliest publication about "spot test" was Schiff's detection of uric acid in 1859) and of Christian Friedrich Schonberg and Friedrich Goppelsröder on capillary analysis.

On the occasion of Feigl's 70th birthday the Chemical Society of Midland sponsored a symposium in 1952, attended by 500 scientists from 24 countries, in which all plenary sessions were related to spot tests.

The test uses the qualitative characteristics of colored compounds to account for performed chemical reactions. This technique has been used to develop new quantification methods using modern technology.

== Microbiology ==
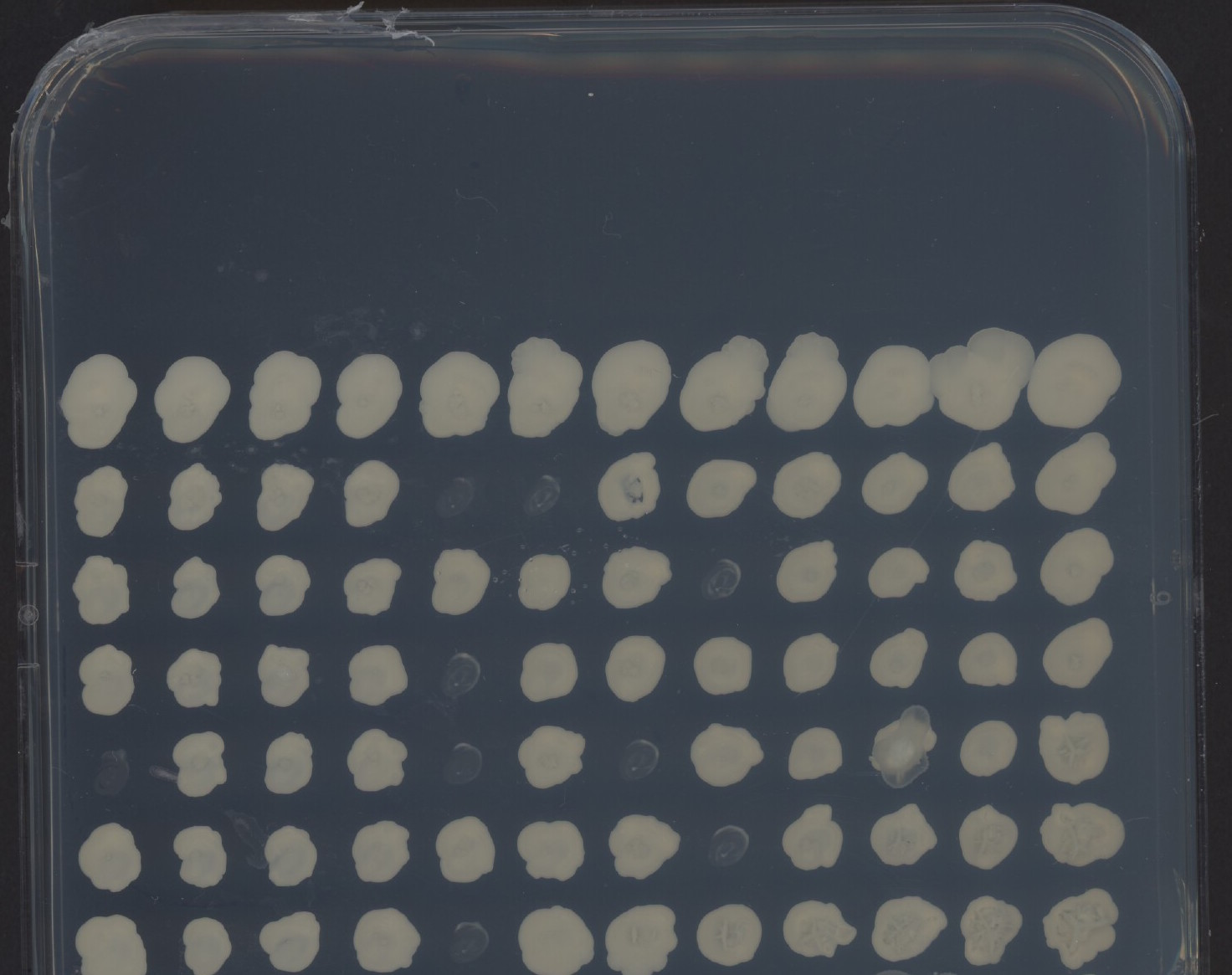
Spot assay of yeast cells on an agar plate. The spots show either growth (cells) or no growth (no cells)

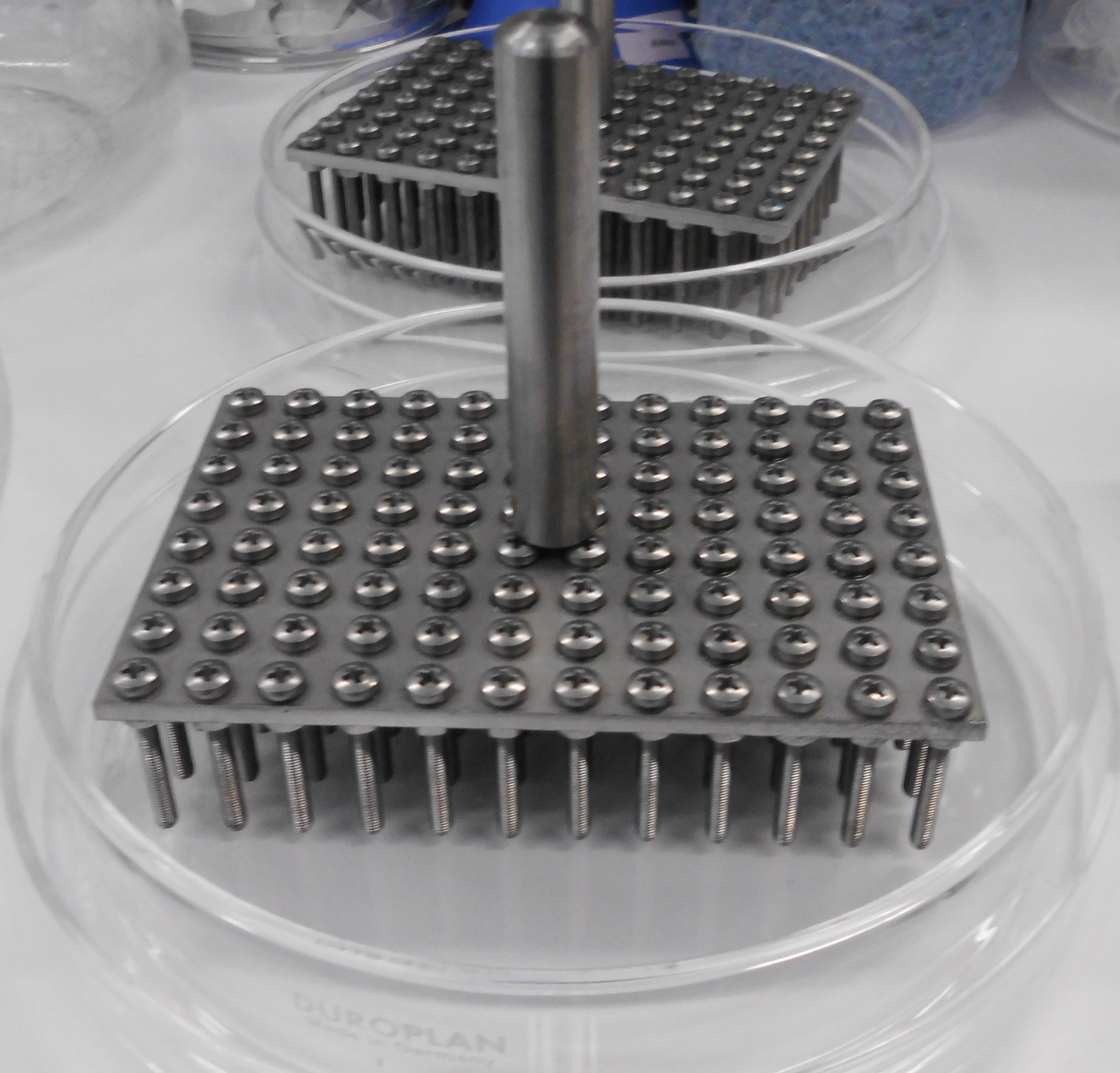
96 pinner used to perform spot assays with yeast or bacterial cells

A spot assay or spot test can also refer to a specific test in microbiology. This test is often used to check the growth rate of bacterial or yeast cells on different media or to perform serial dilution tests of micro-organisms. Usually a 96-pinner (often called frogger) is used to perform these spot assay. Another application is high-throughput screening, which often uses spot assays to determine the growth of eg. mated cells or to check for protein-protein interactions in a yeast two-hybrid test. This is often done with a robot.

== See also ==
- Spot test (lichen)
- Touchstone
