= Maria Kuhnert-Brandstätter =

Austrian thermomicroscopy researcher

- Born: 23 December 1919; Lamprechtshausen, Austria
- Died: 20 April 2011 (aged 91)
- Education: University of Innsbruck
- Occupation: Pharmacist
- Known for: Thermomicroscopy research
- Spouse: Gerhard Kuhnert

Maria Kuhnert-Brandstätter (23 December 1919, Lamprechtshausen – 20 April 2011), was an Austrian pharmacist trained in pharmacognosy and known for her research on thermomicroscopy, and her microchemical investigations of natural and synthetic drug substances.

== Biography ==
Maria was born in Lamprechtshausen, north of Salzburg, Austria, on 23 December 1919. She studied at the Ludwig-Maximilians-Universität München, and continued her studies of pharmacy and pharmacognosy in Vienna before graduating from the University of Innsbruck in 1942. Later that year, she became a student of pharmacologist Ludwig Kofler at the University of Innsbruck and received her doctorate there in 1945 in pharmacognosy, which is the use of plants or other natural sources as a source of pharmaceuticals.

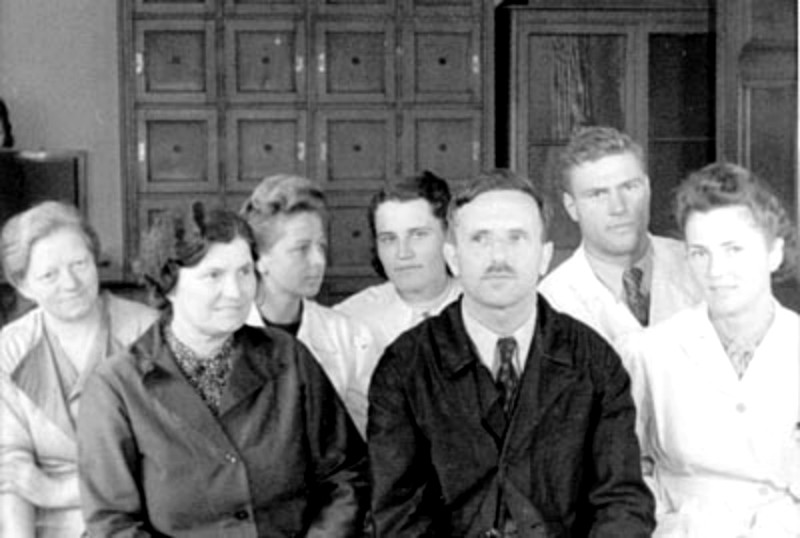
Maria Kuhnert-Brandstätter, second from left in back row. (Front row, Adelheid Kofler and Ludwig Kofler.)

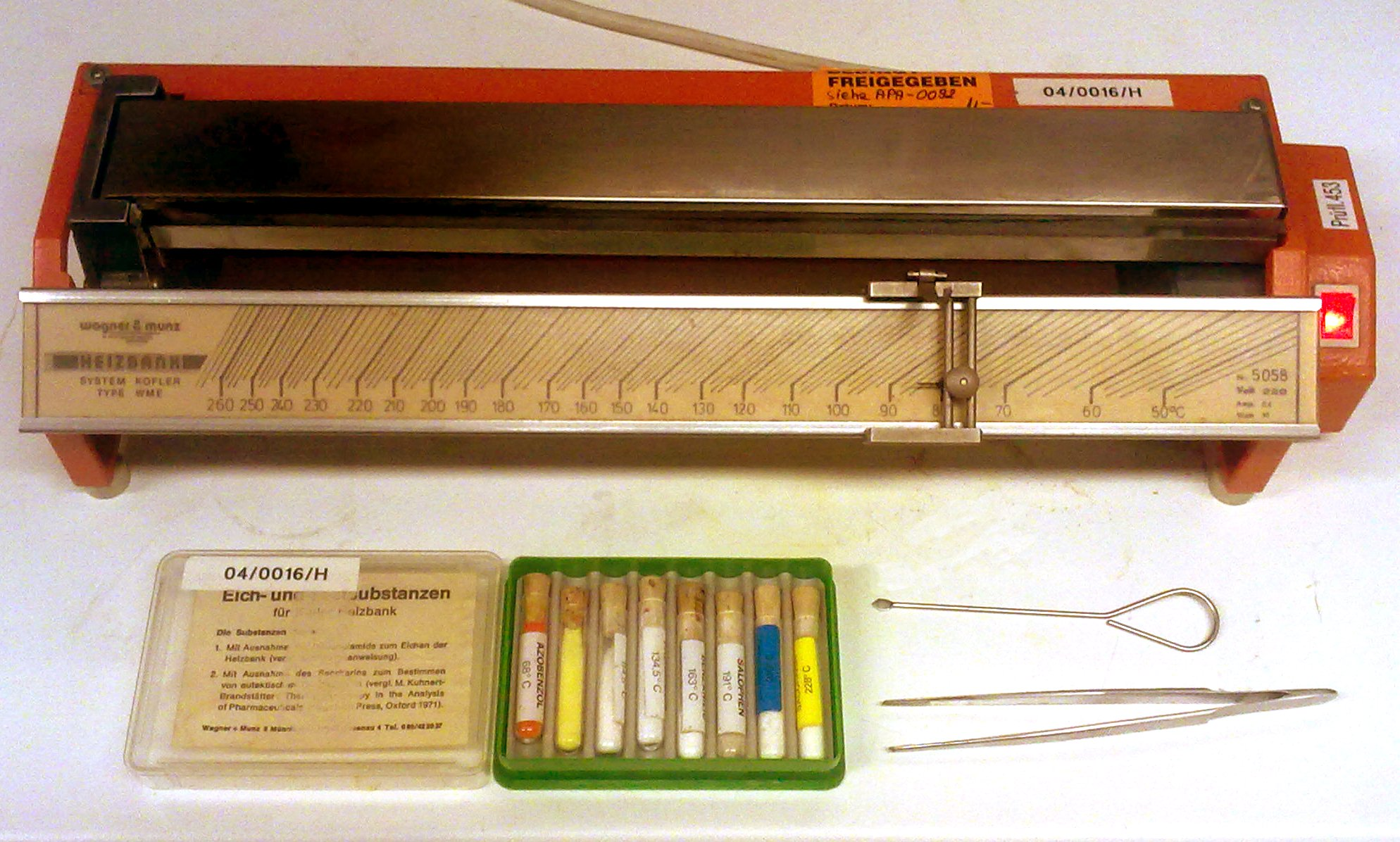
Kofler hot bench with samples for calibration.

In 1945, she was appointed head of the Institute of Pharmacognosy at the University of Innsbruck, where she worked for over half a century. There she collaborated with her advisor, the pharmacist Ludwig Kofler, as well as his wife mineralogist Adelheid Kofler. Kuhnert-Brandstätter also improved two new machines invented by the Koflers to analyze microscopic quantities of pharmaceuticals: the hot stage microscope (“Koflersches Thermomikroskop”) and the Kofler hot bench (“Koflersche Heizbank”).

Kuhnert-Brandstätter was named a full professor at the university's Department of Pharmacy in 1966 and, from 1970 on, she was the only female professor in natural sciences at the University of Innsbruck. She retired in 1989, but for more than a decade after that, she remained scientifically active and followed pharmacy developments with great interest. She was named professor emeritus in 1989.

When her husband, pharmacist Gerhard Kuhnert, died in May 2010, she suffered a great personal loss and died in April of the following year at 91.

== Research ==
Kuhnert-Brandstätter's research included more than 200 academic publications as well as several books and scientific films. Her initial interest was identifying medicinal substances using the Koflers newly invented heating microscope. She expanded the microscope's design very early, exploring its applications and devoting time to more complex scientific tasks such as analyzing mixtures of substance and the so-called polymorphism phenomena. For many years the device was regarded as very exotic but is now an integral part of researching and developing drugs and other products such as phytosanitary products.

For many years, Kuhnert-Brandstätter continued her research on microthermoanalytical methods, and she combined that study with additional analytical methods, including UV- and IR-spectroscopy and differential thermal analysis, to characterize the pharmaceutical compounds being studied. Publications from her pioneering research dealt mainly with microscopy and thermal analysis, thereby greatly enhancing the international reputations of researchers at the Institute of Pharmacognosy.

Today, Kuhnert-Brandstätter is regarded as a pioneer in these areas of study.

== Awards and honors ==
Kuhnert-Brandstätter received a number of awards and honors during her lifetime.

- Presidency of the Austrian Society for Microchemistry and Analytics Chemistry (1975-1981)
- Honorary membership in the American Pharmaceutical Society, and the Hungarian Pharmaceutical Society
- The Fritz Pregl Prize (Austrian Academy of Sciences)
- The Carl Mannich Medal (German Pharmaceutical Society)
- The Austrian Cross of Honor for Science and Art 1st Class
- The State Microscopical Society of Illinois Certificate of Merit and Honor for the Advancement of the Art and Science of Microscopy, 1976
- The Ernst Abbe Prize of the New York Microscopical Society, 2000

== Selected publications ==
The first of Kuhnert-Brandstätter's several hundred published papers appeared in 1941 and described the thermomicroscopical characterization of drug substances. The following list of publications is in order by the number of times the article was cited by another author; Thermomicroscopy... has been cited most often, 228 times as of 2020.

- Kuhnert-Brandstätter, Maria. Thermomicroscopy in the Analysis of Pharmaceuticals. Vol. 45. Pergamon, 1971.
- Kuhnert-Brandstätter, M., A. Kofler, and G. Kramer. "Beitrag zur mikroskopischen Charakterisierung und Identifizierung von Arzneimitteln unter Einbeziehung der UV-Spektrophotometrie." Sci Pharm 42 (1974): 150-63.
- Kuhnert-Brandstätter, M., and H. Grimm. "Zur Unterscheidung von lösungsmittelhaltigen pseudopolymorphen Kristallformen und polymorphen Modifikationen bei Steroidhormonen. II." Microchimica Acta 56.1 (1968): 127-139.
- Kuhnert‐Brandstätter, Maria. "Polymorphie bei Arzneistoffen." Pharmazie in unserer Zeit 4.5 (1975): 131-137.
- Kuhnert-Brandstätter, M., and E. Junger. "IR-spektroskopische Untersuchungen an polymorphen Kristallmodifikationen von Alkoholen und Phenolen." Spectrochimica Acta Part A: Molecular Spectroscopy 23.5 (1967): 1453-1461.
- Kuhnert-Brandstätter, M., and A. Burger. "Untersuchungen zum Aufloesungsverhalten polymorpher, pseudopolymorpher and amorpher Phasen von Arzneimitteln." Pharm Ind 34 (1972): 187-90.
- Kuhnert-Brandstätter, M., and R. Völlenklee. "Thermoanalytische und IR-spektroskopische Untersuchungen an polymorphen Arzneistoffen: Acemetacin, piroxicam, propranololhydrochlorid und Urapidil." Fresenius' Zeitschrift für analytische Chemie 322.2 (1985): 164-169.
- Kuhnert-Brandstätter, M., and S. Wunsch. "Polymorphie und Mischkristallbildung bei Sulfonamiden und verwandten Verbindungen." Microchimica Acta 57.6 (1969): 1297-1307.
