= Eschringen =

- Village
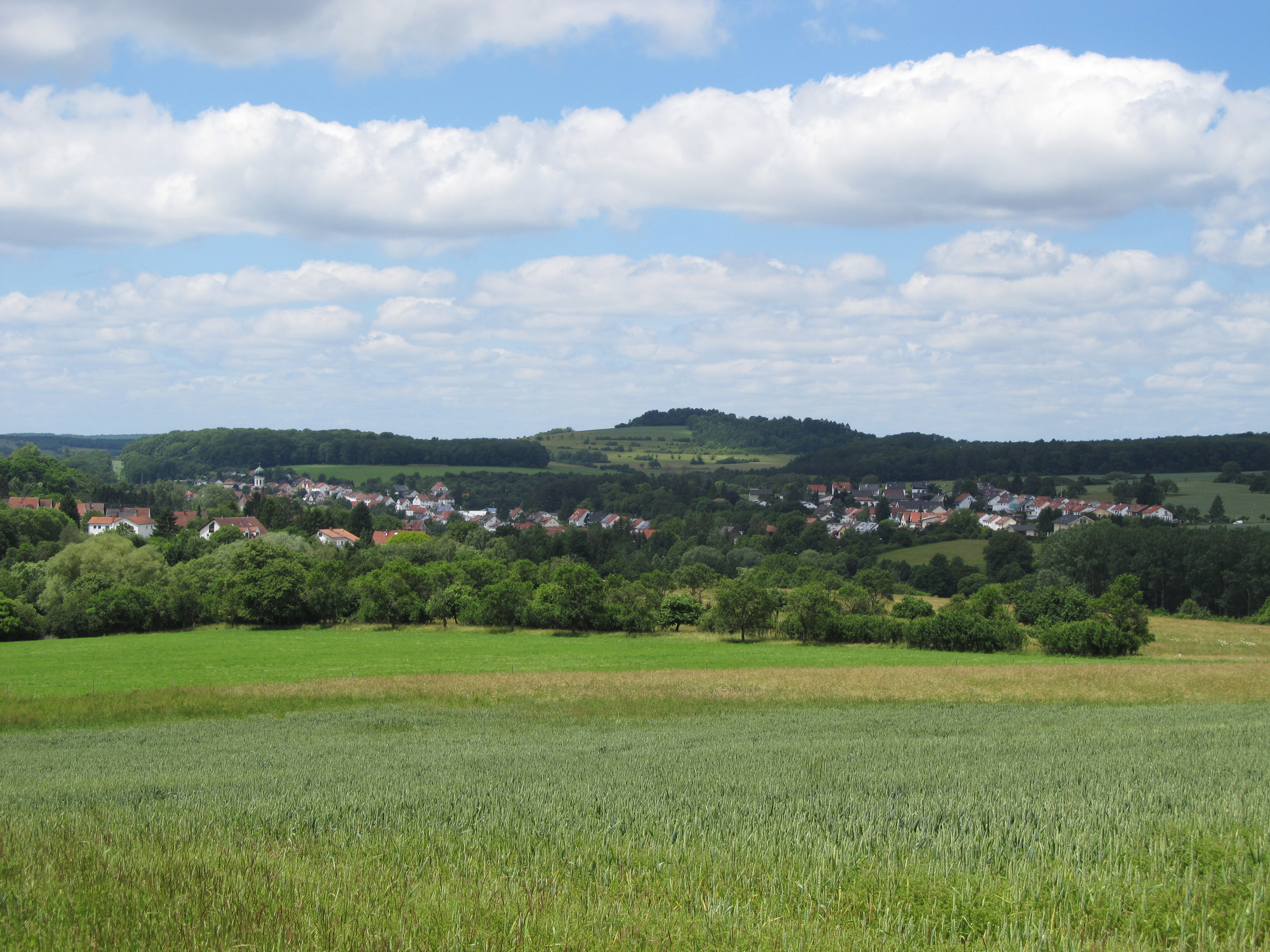
- A view on Eschringen from the Wickersberg

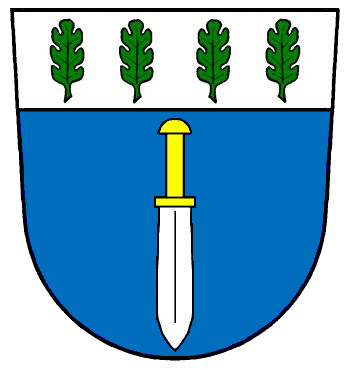
- Coat of arms

- Location in Germany
- Coordinates: 49°11′29″N 7°5′38″E
- Country: Germany
- State: Saarland
- City: Saarbrücken

Eschringen is a German village in the diocese of Speyer. Since 1974 it has been a part of Saarbrücken.

== Religion ==
=== Churches ===
The main church of Eschringen is the Roman Catholic church "St. Laurentius" (Saint Lawrence). It was built between 1929 and 1930. The village also contains a smaller Catholic chapel named Laurentiuskapelle, which was built in 1716. According to the list of memorial sights of Saarland, both the church and the chapel are memorial sights.

=== Parish ===
Since 2015, St.Laurentius became part of a newly founded parish called "Heilige Veronika Ensheim" (Saint Veronica). It consists of the four parishes St.Peter Ensheim, St. Laurentius Eschringen, Mariä Heimsuchung (Assumption of the Virgin Mary) Ommersheim, and St. Josef Heckendalheim. Heilige Veronika Ensheim belongs to the diocese of Speyer and the archdiocese of Bamberg.

== History ==
After the congress of Vienna 1816, Eschringen became a part of the Kingdom of Bavaria. After World War I, it was part of the Saar-palatinate area that was ceded from Bavaria to the Territory of the Saar Basin.

== Heraldry ==
The coat of arms was officially in use from 1968 to 1974.

The coat of arms of Eschringen consists of a sword beneath four oak leaves. The sword (a broad seax) is a reference to the early foundation of the village. The four oak leaves symbolize the four formal holders of the village: The counts of Nassau-Saarbrücken, the Teutonic Order, the house of Leyen and the monastery of Gräfinthal.
