= Shape theory =

Shape theory refers to three different theories:

- Shape theory in topology
- Shape analysis (disambiguation) in mathematics and computer science
- Shape theory of olfaction
