= Shape analysis =

Shape analysis may refer to:

- Shape analysis (digital geometry)
- Shape analysis (program analysis), a type of method to analyze computer programs without actually executing the programs
- Statistical shape analysis
- Computational anatomy § Statistical shape theory in computational anatomy
- Computational anatomy
- Bayesian estimation of templates in computational anatomy
- Nucleic acid structure determination § SHAPE, a type of RNA chemical probing to produce secondary structure models
