= Spatial normalization =

Image processing step or image registration method

In neuroimaging, spatial normalization is an image processing step, more specifically an image registration method. Human brains differ in size and shape, and one goal of spatial normalization is to deform human brain scans so one location in one subject's brain scan corresponds to the same location in another subject's brain scan.

It is often performed in research-based functional neuroimaging where one wants to find common brain activation across multiple human subjects. The brain scan can be obtained from magnetic resonance imaging (MRI) or positron emission tomography (PET) scanners.

There are two steps in the spatial normalization process:

- Specification/estimation of warp-field
- Application of warp-field with resampling

The estimation of the warp-field can be performed in one modality, e.g., MRI, and be applied in another modality, e.g., PET, if MRI and PET scans exist for the same subject and they are coregistered.

Spatial normalization typically employs a 3-dimensional nonrigid transformation model (a "warp-field") for warping a brain scan to a template. The warp-field might be parametrized by basis functions such as cosine and polynomia.

== Diffeomorphisms as compositional transformations of coordinates ==
Alternatively, many advanced methods for spatial normalization are building on structure preserving transformations homeomorphisms and diffeomorphisms since they carry smooth submanifolds smoothly during transformation. Diffeomorphisms are generated in the modern field of Computational Anatomy based on diffeomorphic flows, also called diffeomorphic mapping. However, such transformations via diffeomorphisms are not additive, although they form a group with function composition and acting non-linearly on the images via group action. For this reason, flows which generalize the ideas of additive groups allow for generating large deformations that preserve topology, providing 1-1 and onto transformations. Computational methods for generating such transformation are often called LDDMM which provide flows of diffeomorphisms as the main computational tool for connecting coordinate systems corresponding to the geodesic flows of Computational Anatomy.

There is a number of programs that implement both estimation and application of a warp-field. It is a part of the SPM and AIR programs as well as MRI Studio and MRI Cloud.org.

== See also ==
- Voxel-based morphometry
- Computational Anatomy
- LDDMM
