= Pattern theory =

Mathematical formalism describing knowledge of the world as patterns

Pattern theory, formulated by Ulf Grenander, is a mathematical formalism to describe knowledge of the world as patterns. It differs from other approaches to artificial intelligence in that it does not begin by prescribing algorithms and machinery to recognize and classify patterns; rather, it prescribes a vocabulary to articulate and recast the pattern concepts in precise language. Broad in its mathematical coverage, Pattern Theory spans algebra and statistics, as well as local topological and global entropic properties.

In addition to the new algebraic vocabulary, its statistical approach is novel in its aim to:

- Identify the hidden variables of a data set using real world data rather than artificial stimuli, which was previously commonplace.
- Formulate prior distributions for hidden variables and models for the observed variables that form the vertices of a Gibbs-like graph.
- Study the randomness and variability of these graphs.
- Create the basic classes of stochastic models applied by listing the deformations of the patterns.
- Synthesize (sample) from the models, not just analyze signals with them.

The Brown University Pattern Theory Group was formed in 1972 by Ulf Grenander. Many mathematicians are currently working in this group, noteworthy among them being the Fields Medalist David Mumford. Mumford regards Grenander as his "guru" in Pattern Theory.

== See also ==
- Abductive reasoning
- Algebraic statistics
- Computational anatomy
- Formal concept analysis
- Grammar induction
- Image analysis
- Induction
- Lattice theory
- Spatial statistics
