= Morphome =

Morphome is one of the omes in biology to map and classify all the morphological features of species. Morphome is different from phenome in that it is the totality of morphological variants while phenome includes non-morphological variants.

== See also ==
- Genome
- Proteome
- Interactome
