= Group actions in computational anatomy =

Group actions are central to Riemannian geometry and defining orbits (control theory). The orbits of computational anatomy consist of anatomical shapes and medical images; the anatomical shapes are submanifolds of differential geometry consisting of points, curves, surfaces and subvolumes,. This generalized the ideas of the more familiar orbits of linear algebra which are linear vector spaces. Medical images are scalar and tensor images from medical imaging. The group actions are used to define models of human shape which accommodate variation. These orbits are deformable templates as originally formulated more abstractly in pattern theory.

== The orbit model of computational anatomy ==
The central model of human anatomy in computational anatomy is a Groups and group action, a classic formulation from differential geometry. The orbit is called the space of shapes and forms. The space of shapes are denoted $m \in \mathcal {M}$, with the group $(\mathcal{ G}, \circ )$ with law of composition $\circ$; the action of the group on shapes is denoted $g \cdot m$, where the action of the group $g \cdot m \in \mathcal{M}, m \in \mathcal {M}$ is defined to satisfy

$$(g \circ g^\prime) \cdot m = g \cdot (g^\prime \cdot m)\in \mathcal { M} .$$

The orbit $\mathcal{M}$ of the template becomes the space of all shapes, $\mathcal{M} \doteq \{ m = g \cdot m_\mathrm{temp}, g \in \mathcal{G} \}$.

== Several group actions in computational anatomy ==
The central group in CA defined on volumes in ${\mathbb R}^3$ are the diffeomorphism group $\mathcal{G} \doteq \mathrm{Diff}$ which are mappings with 3-components $\phi(\cdot) = (\phi_1(\cdot),\phi_2 (\cdot),\phi_3 (\cdot))$, law of composition of functions $\phi \circ \phi^\prime (\cdot)\doteq \phi (\phi^\prime(\cdot))$, with inverse $\phi \circ \phi^{-1}(\cdot) =\phi ( \phi^{-1}(\cdot))= \operatorname{id}$.

=== Submanifolds: organs, subcortical structures, charts, and immersions ===
For sub-manifolds $X \subset {\mathbb R}^3 \in \mathcal{M}$, parametrized by a chart or immersion $m(u), u \in U$, the diffeomorphic action the flow of the position

$$\phi \cdot m(u) \doteq \phi\circ m(u), u \in U$$.

=== Scalar images such as MRI, CT, PET ===
Most popular are scalar images, $I(x),x \in {\mathbb R}^3$, with action on the right via the inverse.

$$\phi \cdot I(x) = I \circ \phi^{-1} (x), x \in {\mathbb R}^3$$.

=== Oriented tangents on curves, eigenvectors of tensor matrices ===
Many different imaging modalities are being used with various actions. For images such that $I(x)$ is a three-dimensional vector then

$$\varphi\cdot I = ((D\varphi) \, I)\circ \varphi^{-1} ,$$
$$\varphi \star I =  ((D\varphi^T)^{-1}I) \circ \varphi^{-1}$$

=== Tensor matrices ===
Cao et al. examined actions for mapping MRI images measured via diffusion tensor imaging and represented via there principle eigenvector. For tensor fields a positively oriented orthonormal basis $I(x) = (I_1 (x), I_2(x), I_3(x))$ of ${\mathbb R}^3$, termed frames, vector cross product denoted $I_1 \times I_2$ then

$$\varphi\cdot I =
\left(\frac{D\varphi I_1}{\|D\varphi\,I_1\|}, \frac{(D\varphi^{ T})^{-1} I_3 \times
D\varphi\,I_1}{\|(D\varphi^{ T})^{-1} I_3 \times D \varphi\,I_1\|},
\frac{(D\varphi^{ T})^{-1} I_3}{\|(D\varphi^{ T})^{-1} I_3\|}\right)\circ \varphi^{-1} \ ,$$

The Frénet frame of three orthonormal vectors, $I_1$ deforms as a tangent, $I_3$ deforms like a normal to the plane generated by $I_1 \times I_2$, and $I_3$. H is uniquely constrained by the basis being positive and orthonormal.

For $3 \times 3$ non-negative symmetric matrices, an action would become $\varphi \cdot I = (D\varphi\, I D\varphi^{T})\circ \varphi^{-1}$.

For mapping MRI DTI images (tensors), then eigenvalues are preserved with the diffeomorphism rotating eigenvectors and preserves the eigenvalues. Given eigenelements $\{\lambda_i, e_i, i=1,2,3 \}$, then the action becomes

$$\varphi \cdot I \doteq( \lambda_1 \hat e_1 \hat e_1^T + \lambda_2 \hat e_2 \hat e_2^T + \lambda_3 \hat e_3 \hat e_3^T ) \circ \varphi^{-1}$$

$$\hat e_1 =  \frac{  D \varphi  e_1 }{\| D \varphi e_1 \|} \ , \hat e_2 = \frac{ D \varphi e_2 - \langle \hat e_1 ,(D \varphi e_2 \rangle \hat e_1 }{\|D \varphi e_2 - \langle \hat e_1 , (D \varphi e_2 \rangle \hat e_1\| } \ , \ \hat e_3 \doteq \hat e_1 \times \hat e_2 \ .$$

=== Orientation Distribution Function and High Angular Resolution HARDI ===
Orientation distribution function (ODF) characterizes the angular profile of the diffusion probability density function of water molecules and can be reconstructed from High Angular Resolution Diffusion Imaging (HARDI). The ODF is a probability density function defined on a unit sphere, ${\mathbb{S}}^2$. In the field of information geometry, the space of ODF forms a Riemannian manifold with the Fisher-Rao metric. For the purpose of LDDMM ODF mapping, the square-root representation is chosen because it is one of the most efficient representations found to date as the various Riemannian operations, such as geodesics, exponential maps, and logarithm maps, are available in closed form. In the following, denote square-root ODF (${\sqrt{\text{ODF}}}$) as $\psi({\bf s})$, where $\psi({\bf s})$ is non-negative to ensure uniqueness and $\int_{{\bf s}\in {\mathbb{S}}^2} \psi^2({\bf s}) d{\bf s}=1$.

Denote diffeomorphic transformation as $\phi$. Group action of diffeomorphism on $\psi({\bf s})$, $\phi \cdot \psi$, needs to guarantee the non-negativity and $\int_{{\bf s}\in {\mathbb{S}}^2} \phi \cdot \psi^2({\bf s}) d{\bf s}=1$. Based on the derivation in, this group action is defined as

$$\begin{align}
(D \phi) \psi\circ \phi^{-1}(x) =   \sqrt{\frac{\det{\bigl(D_{\phi^{-1}}\phi \bigr)^{-1}} }{\left\|{\bigl(D_{\phi^{-1}}\phi \bigr)^{-1} } {\bf s} \right\|^3} } \quad
\psi \left( \frac{(D_{\phi^{-1}}\phi \bigr)^{-1} {\bf s}}{\|(D_{\phi^{-1}}\phi \bigr)^{-1} {\bf s}\|}, \phi^{-1}(x) \right) ,
\end{align}$$

where $(D\phi)$ is the Jacobian of $\phi$.
