= Morphometrics =

Quantitative study of size and shape

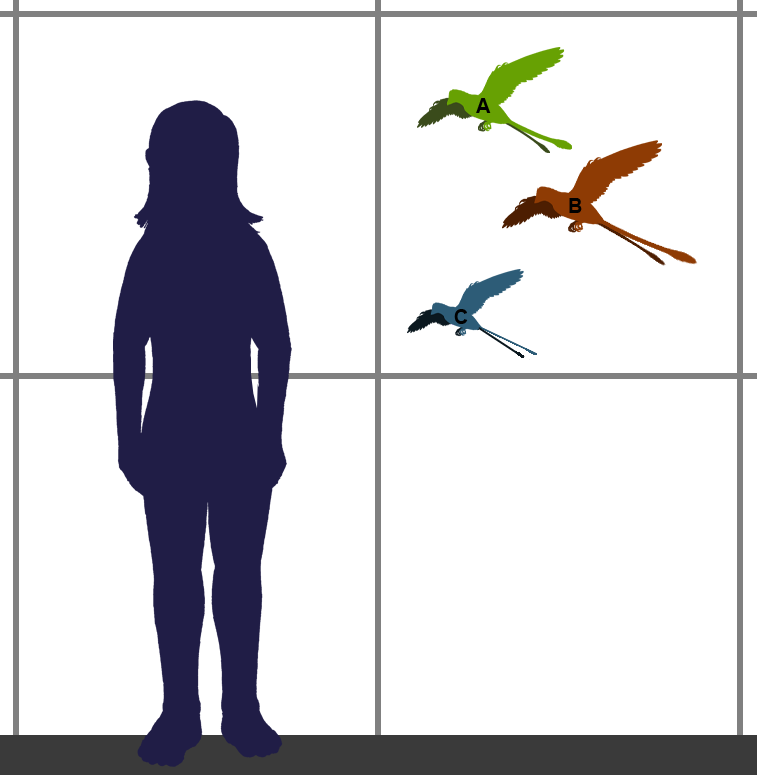
Size of genera in the extinct bird family Confuciusornithidae, compared to a human (1.75 meter tall). A. Changchengornis. Based on the holotype. B. Confuciusornis. Based on several specimens of about the same size. C. Eoconfuciusornis. Based on the holotype IVPP V11977.

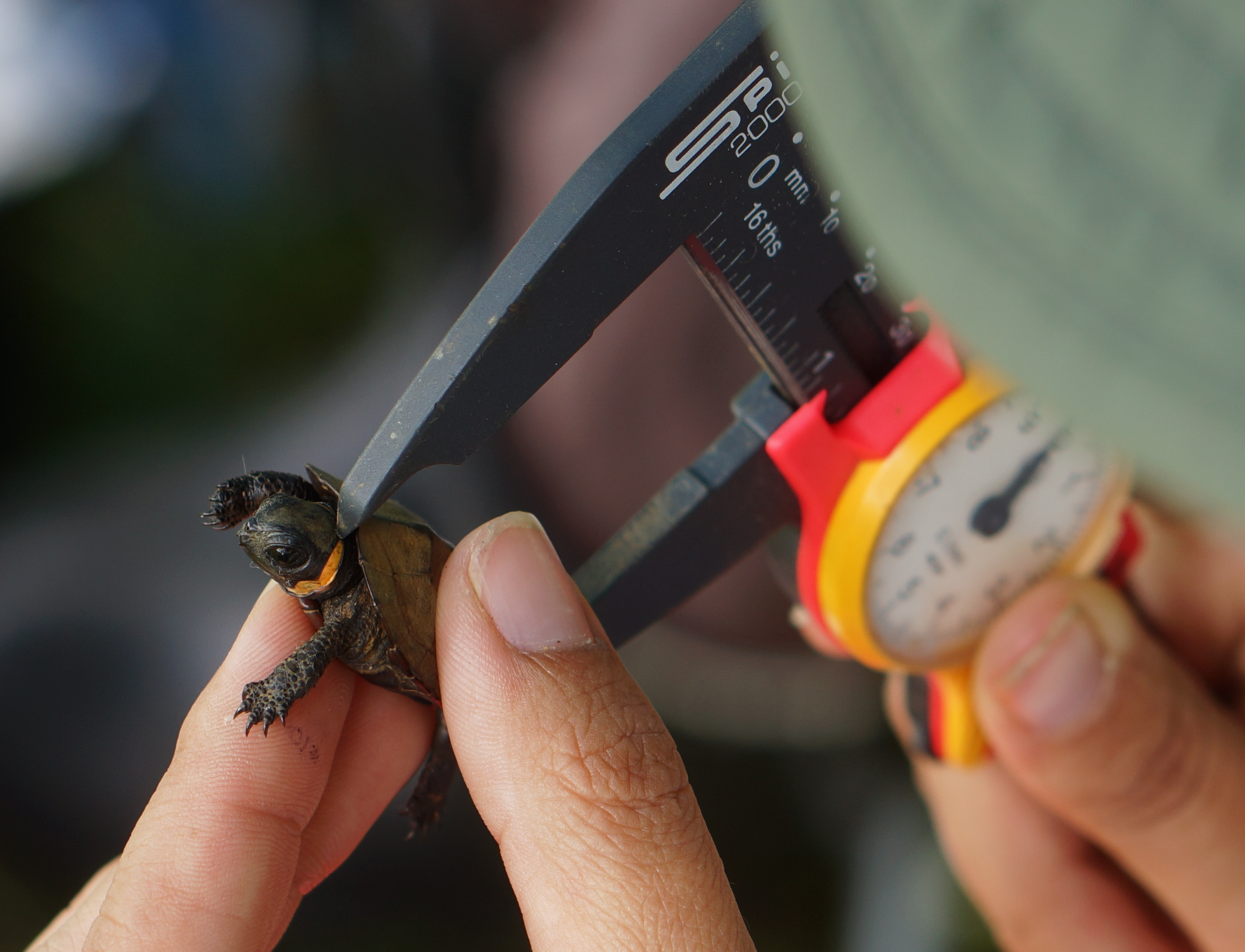
Measuring shell length in bog turtles.

Morphometrics (from Greek μορΦή morphe, "shape, form", and -μετρία metria, "measurement") or morphometry refers to the quantitative analysis of form, a concept that encompasses size and shape. Morphometric analyses are commonly performed on organisms, and are useful in analyzing their fossil record, the impact of mutations on shape, developmental changes in form, covariances between ecological factors and shape, as well for estimating quantitative-genetic parameters of shape. Morphometrics can be used to quantify a trait of evolutionary significance, and by detecting changes in the shape, deduce something of their ontogeny, function or evolutionary relationships. A major objective of morphometrics is to statistically test hypotheses about the factors that affect shape.

"Morphometrics", in the broader sense, is also used to precisely locate certain areas of organs such as the brain, and in describing the shapes of other things.

== Forms ==
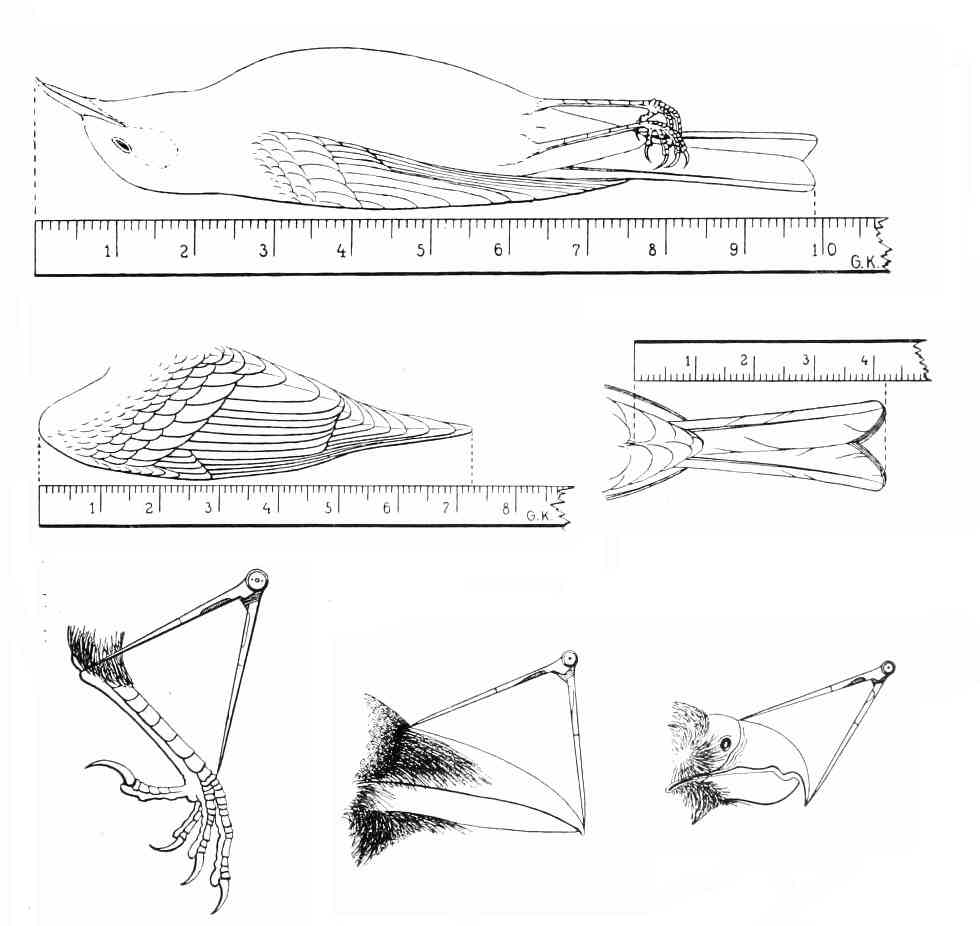
Standard measurements of birds

Three general approaches to form are usually distinguished: traditional morphometrics, landmark-based morphometrics and outline-based morphometrics.

=== "Traditional" morphometrics ===
Traditional morphometrics analyzes lengths, widths, masses, angles, ratios and areas. In general, traditional morphometric data are measurements of size. A drawback of using many measurements of size is that most will be highly correlated; as a result, there are few independent variables despite the many measurements. For instance, tibia length will vary with femur length and also with humerus and ulna length and even with measurements of the head. Traditional morphometric data are nonetheless useful when either absolute or relative sizes are of particular interest, such as in studies of growth. These data are also useful when size measurements are of theoretical importance such as body mass and limb cross-sectional area and length in studies of functional morphology. However, these measurements have one important limitation: they contain little information about the spatial distribution of shape changes across the organism. They are also useful when determining the extent to which certain pollutants have affected an individual. These indices include the hepatosomatic index, gonadosomatic index and also the condition factors (shakumbila, 2014).

=== Landmark-based geometric morphometrics ===
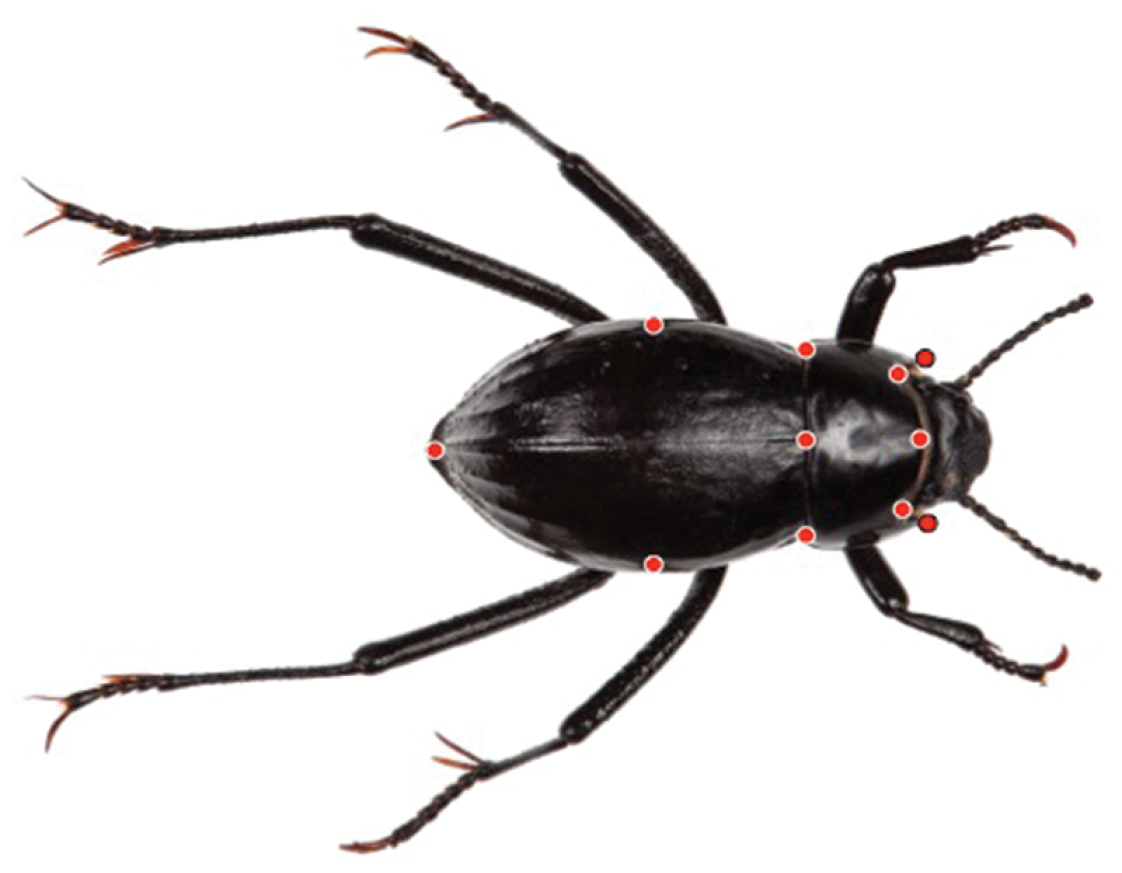
Onymacris unguicularis beetle with landmarks for morphometric analysis

In landmark-based geometric morphometrics, the spatial information missing from traditional morphometrics is contained in the data, because the data are coordinates of landmarks: discrete anatomical loci that are arguably homologous in all individuals in the analysis (i.e. they can be regarded as the "same" point in each specimens in the study). For example, where two specific sutures intersect is a landmark, as are intersections between veins on an insect wing or leaf, or foramina, small holes through which veins and blood vessels pass. Landmark-based studies have traditionally analyzed 2D data, but with the increasing availability of 3D imaging techniques, 3D analyses are becoming more feasible even for small structures such as teeth. Finding enough landmarks to provide a comprehensive description of shape can be difficult when working with fossils or easily damaged specimens. That is because all landmarks must be present in all specimens, although coordinates of missing landmarks can be estimated. The data for each individual consists of a configuration of landmarks.

There are three recognized categories of landmarks. Type 1 landmarks are defined locally, i.e. in terms of structures close to that point; for example, an intersection between three sutures, or intersections between veins on an insect wing are locally defined and surrounded by tissue on all sides. Type 3 landmarks, in contrast, are defined in terms of points far away from the landmark, and are often defined in terms of a point "furthest away" from another point. Type 2 landmarks are intermediate; this category includes points such as the tip structure, or local minima and maxima of curvature. They are defined in terms of local features, but they are not surrounded on all sides. In addition to landmarks, there are semilandmarks, points whose position along a curve is arbitrary but which provide information about curvature in two or three dimensions.

==== Procrustes-based geometric morphometrics ====
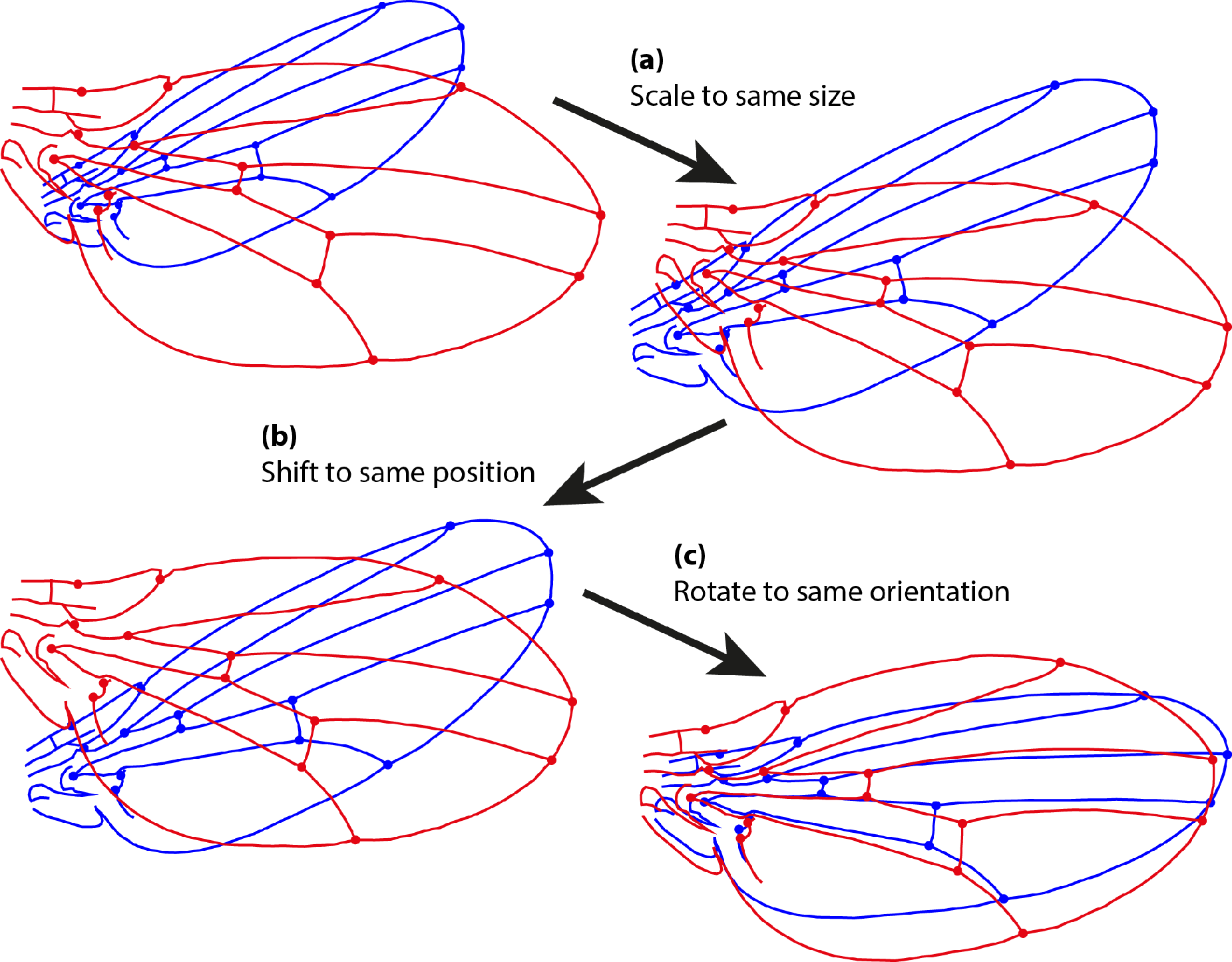
Procrustes superimposition

Shape analysis begins by removing the information that is not about shape. By definition, shape is not altered by translation, scaling or rotation. Thus, to compare shapes, the non-shape information is removed from the coordinates of landmarks. There is more than one way to do these three operations. One method is to fix the coordinates of two points to (0,0) and (0,1), which are the two ends of a baseline. In one step, the shapes are translated to the same position (the same two coordinates are fixed to those values), the shapes are scaled (to unit baseline length) and the shapes are rotated. An alternative, and preferred method, is Procrustes superimposition. This method translates the centroid of the shapes to (0,0); the x coordinate of the centroid is the average of the x coordinates of the landmarks, and the y coordinate of the centroid is the average of the y-coordinates. Shapes are scaled to unit centroid size, which is the square root of the summed squared distances of each landmark to the centroid. The configuration is rotated to minimize the deviation between it and a reference, typically the mean shape. In the case of semi-landmarks, variation in position along the curve is also removed. Because shape space is curved, analyses are done by projecting shapes onto a space tangent to shape space. Within the tangent space, conventional multivariate statistical methods such as multivariate analysis of variance and multivariate regression, can be used to test statistical hypotheses about shape.

Procrustes-based analyses have some limitations. One is that the Procrustes superimposition uses a least-squares criterion to find the optimal rotation; consequently, variation that is localized to a single landmark will be smeared out across many. This is called the 'Pinocchio effect'. Another is that the superimposition may itself impose a pattern of covariation on the landmarks. Additionally, any information that cannot be captured by landmarks and semilandmarks cannot be analyzed, including classical measurements like "greatest skull breadth". Moreover, there are criticisms of Procrustes-based methods that motivate an alternative approach to analyzing landmark data.

==== Diffeomorphometry ====
Diffeomorphometry is the focus on comparison of shapes and forms with a metric structure based on diffeomorphisms, and is central to the field of computational anatomy. Diffeomorphic registration, introduced in the 90s, is now an important player with existing code bases organized around ANTS, DARTEL, DEMONS, LDDMM, StationaryLDDMM are examples of actively used computational codes for constructing correspondences between coordinate systems based on sparse features and dense images. Voxel-based morphometry (VBM) is an important technology built on many of these principles. Methods based on diffeomorphic flows are used in For example, deformations could be diffeomorphisms of the ambient space, resulting in the LDDMM (Large Deformation Diffeomorphic Metric Mapping) framework for shape comparison. On such deformations is the right invariant metric of Computational Anatomy which generalizes the metric of non-compressible Eulerian flows but to include the Sobolev norm ensuring smoothness of the flows, metrics have now been defined associated to Hamiltonian controls of diffeomorphic flows.

=== Outline analysis ===
The results of principal component analysis performed on an outline analysis of some thelodont denticles.

Outline analysis is another approach to analyzing shape. What distinguishes outline analysis is that coefficients of mathematical functions are fitted to points sampled along the outline. There are a number of ways of quantifying an outline. Older techniques such as the "fit to a polynomial curve" and Principal components quantitative analysis have been superseded by the two main modern approaches: eigenshape analysis, and elliptic Fourier analysis (EFA), using hand- or computer-traced outlines. The former involves fitting a preset number of semilandmarks at equal intervals around the outline of a shape, recording the deviation of each step from semilandmark to semilandmark from what the angle of that step would be were the object a simple circle. The latter defines the outline as the sum of the minimum number of ellipses required to mimic the shape.

Both methods have their weaknesses; the most dangerous (and easily overcome) is their susceptibility to noise in the outline. Likewise, neither compares homologous points, and global change is always given more weight than local variation (which may have large biological consequences). Eigenshape analysis requires an equivalent starting point to be set for each specimen, which can be a source of error EFA also suffers from redundancy in that not all variables are independent. On the other hand, it is possible to apply them to complex curves without having to define a centroid; this makes removing the effect of location, size and rotation much simpler. The perceived failings of outline morphometrics are that it does not compare points of a homologous origin, and that it oversimplifies complex shapes by restricting itself to considering the outline and not internal changes. Also, since it works by approximating the outline by a series of ellipses, it deals poorly with pointed shapes.

One criticism of outline-based methods is that they disregard homology – a famous example of this disregard being the ability of outline-based methods to compare a scapula to a potato chip. Such a comparison which would not be possible if the data were restricted to biologically homologous points. An argument against that critique is that, if landmark approaches to morphometrics can be used to test biological hypotheses in the absence of homology data, it is inappropriate to fault outline-based approaches for enabling the same types of studies.

== Analyzing data ==
Multivariate statistical methods can be used to test statistical hypotheses about factors that affect shape and to visualize their effects. To visualize the patterns of variation in the data, the data need to be reduced to a comprehensible (low-dimensional) form. Principal component analysis (PCA) is a commonly employed tool to summarize the variation. Simply put, the technique projects as much of the overall variation as possible into a few dimensions. See the figure at the right for an example. Each axis on a PCA plot is an eigenvector of the covariance matrix of shape variables. The first axis accounts for maximum variation in the sample, with further axes representing further ways in which the samples vary. The pattern of clustering of samples in this morphospace represents similarities and differences in shapes, which can reflect phylogenetic relationships. As well as exploring patterns of variation, Multivariate statistical methods can be used to test statistical hypotheses about factors that affect shape and to visualize their effects, although PCA is not needed for this purpose unless the method requires inverting the variance-covariance matrix.

Landmark data allow the difference between population means, or the deviation an individual from its population mean, to be visualized in at least two ways. One depicts vectors at landmarks that show the magnitude and direction in which that landmark is displaced relative to the others. The second depicts the difference via the thin plate splines, an interpolation function that models change between landmarks from the data of changes in coordinates of landmarks. This function produces what look like deformed grids; where regions that relatively elongated, the grid will look stretched and where those regions are relatively shortened, the grid will look compressed.

== Ecology and evolutionary biology ==
D'Arcy Thompson in 1917 suggested that shapes in many different species could also be related in this way. In the case of shells and horns he gave a fairly precise analysis... But he also drew various pictures of fishes and skulls, and argued that they were related by deformations of coordinates.

Shape analysis is widely used in ecology and evolutionary biology to study plasticity, evolutionary changes in shape and in evolutionary developmental biology to study the evolution of the ontogeny of shape, as well as the developmental origins of developmental stability, canalization and modularity. Many other applications of shape analysis in ecology and evolutionary biology can be found in the introductory text: Zelditch, ML; Swiderski, DL; Sheets, HD (2012). Geometric Morphometrics for Biologists: A Primer. London: Elsevier: Academic Press.

=== Neuroimaging ===
In neuroimaging, the shape and structure of the brains of living creatures can be measured using magnetic resonance imaging. The most common variants are voxel-based morphometry, which measures the volume of brain structures, deformation-based morphometry, which measures differences in shape from a template brain, and surface-based morphometry which quantifies the shape of the cerebral cortex.

=== Bone histomorphometry ===
Histomorphometry of bone involves obtaining a bone biopsy specimen and processing of bone specimens in the laboratory, obtaining estimates of the proportional volumes and surfaces occupied by different components of bone. First the bone is broken down by baths in highly concentrated ethanol and acetone. The bone is then embedded and stained so that it can be visualized/analyzed under a microscope. Obtaining a bone biopsy is accomplished by using a bone biopsy trephine.

== See also ==
- Allometry
- Allometric engineering
- Brain morphometry
- D'Arcy Wentworth Thompson
- Geometric morphometrics in anthropology
- Geomorphometrics
- Meristics
- Phylogenetic comparative methods
- Functional morphology

== Notes ==
^1 from Greek: "morph", meaning shape or form, and "metron", measurement

== Bibliography ==
- Adams, Dean C.; Michael L. Collyer (2009). "A general framework for the analysis of phenotypic trajectories in evolutionary studies". Evolution. 63 (5): 1143–1154. doi:10.1111/j.1558-5646.2009.00649.x. PMID 19210539. S2CID 1873905.
- Bookstein, Fred (1991). Morphometric Tools for Landmark Data: Geometry and Biology. Cambridge: Cambridge University Press. ISBN 978-0-521-58598-9.
- Cadrin, Steven X. (2000). "Advances in morphometric identification of fishery stocks". Reviews in Fish Biology and Fisheries. 10: 91–112. doi:10.1023/A:1008939104413. S2CID 25658507.
- Elewa, A.M.T., ed. (2004). Morphometrics: Applications In Biology And Paleontology. Berlin: Springer. ISBN 978-3-540-21429-8.
- Klingenberg, C.P.; N. A. Gidaszewski (2010). "Testing and quantifying phylogenetic signals and homoplasy in morphometric data". Systematic Biology. 59 (3): 245–261. doi:10.1093/sysbio/syp106. PMID 20525633.
- McLellan, Tracy; Endler, John A. (1998). "The Relative Success of Some Methods for Measuring and Describing the Shape of Complex Objects". Systematic Biology. 47 (2): 264–81. doi:10.1080/106351598260914. hdl:10536/DRO/DU:30094507. ISSN 1076-836X. JSTOR 2585371.
- Rohlf, F.J.; D. Slice (1990). "Extensions of the Procrustes method for the optimal superimposition of landmarks". Systematic Zoology. 10 (39): 40–59. doi:10.2307/2992207. JSTOR 2992207.
