= Statistical shape analysis =

Analysis of geometric properties

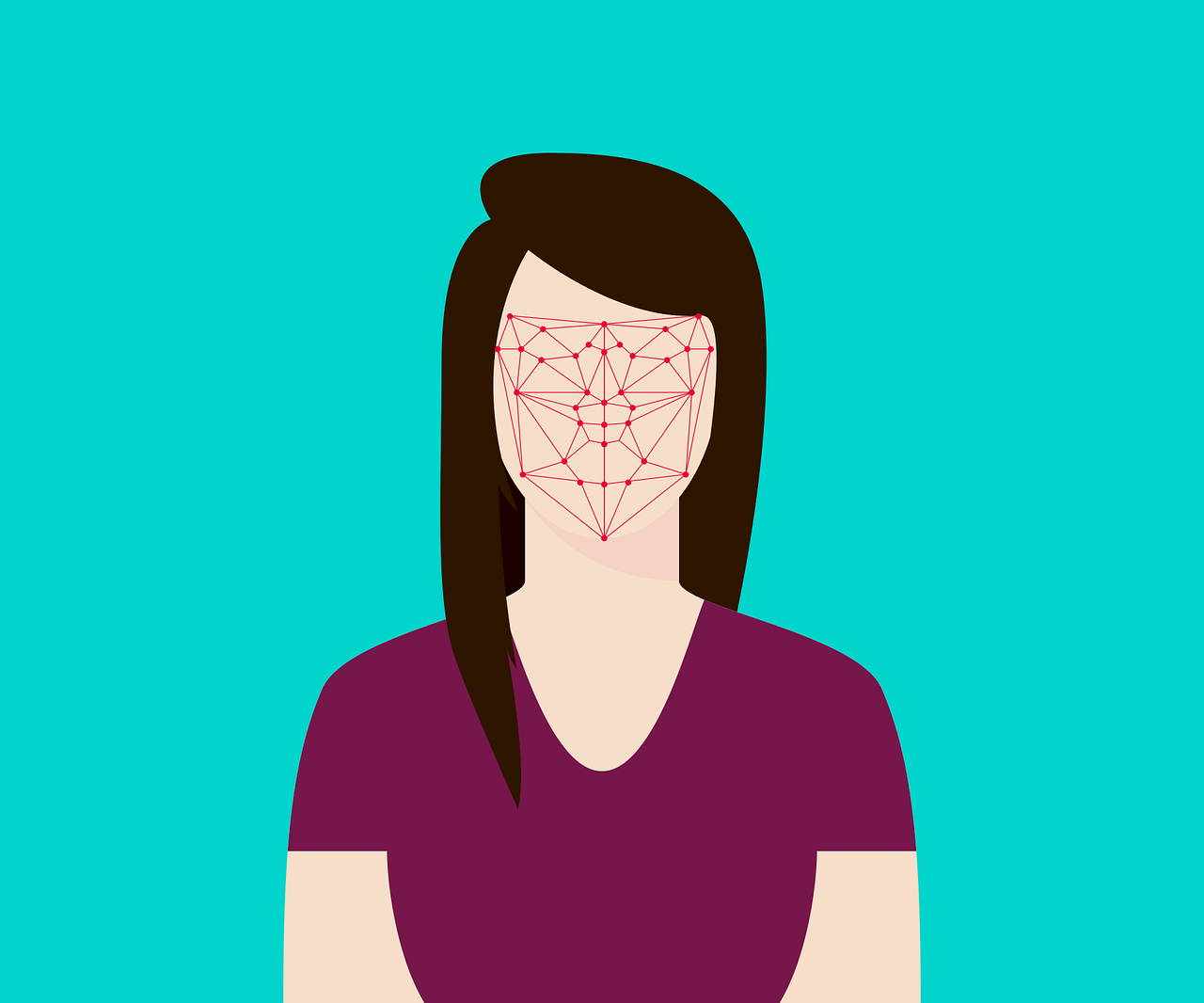
An illustration of how a human face can be broken into shapes for facial recognition

Statistical shape analysis is an analysis of the geometrical properties of some given set of shapes by statistical methods. For instance, it could be used to quantify differences between male and female gorilla skull shapes, normal and pathological bone shapes, leaf outlines with and without herbivory by insects, etc. Important aspects of shape analysis are to obtain a measure of distance between shapes, to estimate mean shapes from (possibly random) samples, to estimate shape variability within samples, to perform clustering and to test for differences between shapes. One of the main methods used is principal component analysis (PCA). Statistical shape analysis has applications in various fields, including medical imaging, computer vision, computational anatomy, sensor measurement, and geographical profiling.

== Landmark-based techniques ==
In the point distribution model, a shape is determined by a finite set of coordinate points, known as landmark points. These landmark points often correspond to important identifiable features such as the corners of the eyes. Once the points are collected some form of registration is undertaken. This can be a baseline methods used by Fred Bookstein for geometric morphometrics in anthropology. Or an approach like Procrustes analysis which finds an average shape.

David George Kendall investigated the statistical distribution of the shape of triangles, and represented each triangle by a point on a sphere. He used this distribution on the sphere to investigate ley lines and whether three stones were more likely to be co-linear than might be expected. Statistical distribution like the Kent distribution can be used to analyse the distribution of such spaces.

Alternatively, shapes can be represented by curves or surfaces representing their contours, by the spatial region they occupy.

== Shape deformations ==
Differences between shapes can be quantified by investigating deformations transforming one shape into another. In particular a diffeomorphism preserves smoothness in the deformation. This was pioneered in D'Arcy Thompson's On Growth and Form before the advent of computers. Deformations can be interpreted as resulting from a force applied to the shape. Mathematically, a deformation is defined as a mapping from a shape x to a shape y by a transformation function $\Phi$, i.e., $y = \Phi(x)$. Given a notion of size of deformations, the distance between two shapes can be defined as the size of the smallest deformation between these shapes.

Diffeomorphometry is the focus on comparison of shapes and forms with a metric structure based on diffeomorphisms, and is central to the field of Computational anatomy. Diffeomorphic registration, introduced in the 90's, is now an important player with existing codes bases organized around ANTS, DARTEL, DEMONS, LDDMM, StationaryLDDMM, and FastLDDMM are examples of actively used computational codes for constructing correspondences between coordinate systems based on sparse features and dense images. Voxel-based morphometry (VBM) is an important technology built on many of these principles. Methods based on diffeomorphic flows are also used. For example, deformations could be diffeomorphisms of the ambient space, resulting in the LDDMM (Large Deformation Diffeomorphic Metric Mapping) framework for shape comparison.

== See also ==
- Active shape model
- Geometric data analysis
- Shape analysis (disambiguation)
- Procrustes analysis
- Computational anatomy
- Large Deformation Diffeomorphic Metric Mapping
- Bayesian Estimation of Templates in Computational Anatomy
- Bayesian model of computational anatomy
- 3D Face Morphable Model
