= Brain morphometry =

Brain morphometry is a subfield of both morphometry and the brain sciences, concerned with the measurement of brain structures and changes thereof during development, aging, learning, disease and evolution. Since autopsy-like dissection is generally impossible on living brains, brain morphometry starts with noninvasive neuroimaging data, typically obtained from magnetic resonance imaging (MRI). These data are born digital, which allows researchers to analyze the brain images further by using advanced mathematical and statistical methods such as shape quantification or multivariate analysis. This allows researchers to quantify anatomical features of the brain in terms of shape, mass, volume (e.g. of the hippocampus, or of the primary versus secondary visual cortex), and to derive more specific information, such as the encephalization quotient, grey matter density and white matter connectivity, gyrification, cortical thickness, or the amount of cerebrospinal fluid. These variables can then be mapped within the brain volume or on the brain surface, providing a convenient way to assess their pattern and extent over time, across individuals or even between different biological species. The field is rapidly evolving along with neuroimaging techniques—which deliver the underlying data—but also develops in part independently from them, as part of the emerging field of neuroinformatics, which is concerned with developing and adapting algorithms to analyze those data.

== Background ==
=== Terminology ===
The term brain mapping is often used interchangeably with brain morphometry, although mapping in the narrower sense of projecting properties of the brain onto a template brain is, strictly speaking, only a subfield of brain morphometry. On the other hand, though much more rarely, neuromorphometry is also sometimes used as a synonym for brain morphometry (particularly in the earlier literature, e.g. Haug 1986), though technically is only one of its subfields.

=== Biology ===
The morphology and function of a complex organ like the brain are the result of numerous biochemical and biophysical processes interacting in a highly complex manner across multiple scales in space and time (Vallender et al., 2008). Most of the genes known to control these processes during brain development, maturation and aging are highly conserved (Holland, 2003), though some show polymorphisms (cf. Meda et al., 2008), and pronounced differences at the cognitive level abound even amongst closely related species, or between individuals within a species (Roth and Dicke, 2005).

In contrast, variations in macroscopic brain anatomy (i.e., at a level of detail still discernible by the naked human eye) are sufficiently conserved to allow for comparative analyses, yet diverse enough to reflect variations within and between individuals and species: As morphological analyses that compare brains at different onto-genetic or pathogenic stages can reveal important information about the progression of normal or abnormal development within a given species, cross-species comparative studies have a similar potential to reveal evolutionary trends and phylogenetic relationships.

Given that the imaging modalities commonly employed for brain morphometric investigations are essentially of a molecular or even sub-atomic nature, a number of factors may interfere with derived quantification of brain structures. These include all of the parameters mentioned in "Applications" but also the state of hydration, hormonal status, medication and substance abuse.

=== Technical requirements ===
There are two major prerequisites for brain morphometry: First, the brain features of interest must be measurable, and second, statistical methods have to be in place to compare the measurements quantitatively. Shape feature comparisons form the basis of Linnaean taxonomy, and even in cases of convergent evolution or brain disorders, they still provide a wealth of information about the nature of the processes involved. Shape comparisons have long been constrained to simple and mainly volume- or slice-based measures but profited enormously from the digital revolution, as now all sorts of shapes in any number of dimensions can be handled numerically.

In addition, though the extraction of morphometric parameters like brain mass or liquor volume may be relatively straightforward in post mortem samples, most studies in living subjects will by necessity have to use an indirect approach: A spatial representation of the brain or its components is obtained by some appropriate neuroimaging technique, and the parameters of interest can then be analyzed on that basis. Such a structural representation of the brain is also a prerequisite for the interpretation of functional neuroimaging.

The design of a brain morphometric study depends on multiple factors that can be roughly categorized as follows: First, depending on whether ontogenetic, pathological or phylogenetic issues are targeted, the study can be designed as longitudinal (within the same brain, measured at different times), or cross-sectional (across brains). Second, brain image data can be acquired using different neuroimaging modalities. Third, brain properties can be analyzed at different scales (e.g. in the whole brain, regions of interest, cortical or subcortical structures). Fourth, the data can be subjected to different kinds of processing and analysis steps. Brain morphometry as a discipline is mainly concerned with the development of tools addressing this fourth point and integration with the previous ones.

== Methodologies ==
With the exception of the usually slice-based histology of the brain, neuroimaging data are generally stored as matrices of voxels. The most popular morphometric method, thus, is known as Voxel-based morphometry (VBM; cf. Wright et al., 1995; Ashburner and Friston, 2000; Good et al., 2001). Yet as an imaging voxel is not a biologically meaningful unit, other approaches have been developed that potentially bear a closer correspondence to biological structures: Deformation-based morphometry (DBM), surface-based morphometry (SBM) and fiber tracking based on diffusion-weighted imaging (DTI or DSI). All four are usually performed based on Magnetic Resonance (MR) imaging data, with the former three commonly using T1-weighted (e.g. Magnetization Prepared Rapid Gradient Echo, MP-RAGE) and sometimes T2-weighted pulse sequences, while DTI/DSI use diffusion-weighted ones. However, recent evaluation of morphometry algorithms/software demonstrates inconsistency among several of them. This renders a need for systematic and quantitative validation and evaluation of the field.

=== T1-weighted MR-based brain morphometry ===
==== Preprocessing ====
MR images are generated by a complex interaction between static and dynamic electromagnetic fields and the tissue of interest, namely the brain that is encapsulated in the head of the subject. Hence, the raw images contain noise from various sources—namely head movements (a scan suitable for morphometry typically takes on the order of 10 min) that can hardly be corrected or modeled, and bias fields (neither of the electromagnetic fields involved is homogeneous across the whole head nor brain) which can be modeled.

In the following, the image is segmented into non-brain and brain tissue, with the latter usually being sub-segmented into at least gray matter (GM), white matter (WM) and cerebrospinal fluid (CSF). Since image voxels near the class boundaries do not generally contain just one kind of tissue, partial volume effects ensue that can be corrected for.

For comparisons across different scans (within or across subjects), differences in brain size and shape are eliminated by spatially normalizing (i.e. registering) the individual images to the stereotactic space of a template brain. Registration can be performed using low-resolution (i.e. rigid-body or affine transformations) or high-resolution (i.e. highly non-linear) methods, and templates can be generated from the study's pool of brains, from a brain atlas or a derived template generator.

Both the registered images and the deformation fields generated upon registration can be used for morphometric analyses, thereby providing the basis for Voxel-Based Morphometry (VBM) and Deformation-Based Morphometry (DBM). Images segmented into tissue classes can also be used to convert segmentation boundaries into parametric surfaces, the analysis of which is the focus of Surface-Based Morphometry (SBM).

==== Voxel-based morphometry ====
After the individual images are segmented, they are registered to the template. Each voxel then contains a measure of the probability, according to which it belongs to a specific segmentation class. For gray matter, this quantity is usually referred to as gray matter density (GMD) or gray matter concentration (GMC), or gray matter probability (GMP).

In order to correct for the volume changes due to the registration, the gray matter volume (GMV) in the original brain can be calculated by multiplying the GMD with the Jacobian determinants of the deformations used to register the brain to the template. Class-specific volumes for WM and CSF are defined analogously.

The local differences in the density or volume of the different segmentation classes can then be statistically analyzed across scans and interpreted in anatomical terms (e.g. as gray matter atrophy). Since VBM is available for many of the major neuroimaging software packages (e.g. FSL and SPM), it provides an efficient tool to test or generate specific hypotheses about brain changes over time. It is noteworthy, that unlike DBM, considerable criticism and words of caution regarding the correct interpretation of VBM results has been leveled by the medical image computing community

==== Deformation-based morphometry ====
In DBM, highly non-linear registration algorithms are used, and the statistical analyses are not performed on the registered voxels but on the deformation fields used to register them (which requires multivariate approaches) or derived scalar properties thereof, which allows for univariate approaches. One common variant—sometimes referred to as Tensor-based morphometry (TBM)—is based on the Jacobian determinant of the deformation matrix.

Of course, multiple solutions exist for such non-linear warping procedures, and to balance appropriately between the potentially opposing requirements for global and local shape fit, ever more sophisticated registration algorithms are being developed. Most of these, however, are computationally expensive if applied with a high-resolution grid. The biggest advantage of DBM with respect to VBM is its ability to detect subtle changes in longitudinal studies. However, due to the vast variety of registration algorithms, no widely accepted standard for DBM exists, which also prevented its incorporation into major neuroimaging software packages.

==== Pattern based morphometry ====
Pattern based morphometry (PBM) is a method of brain morphometry first put forth in PBM. It builds upon DBM and VBM. PBM is based on the application of sparse dictionary learning to morphometry. As opposed to typical voxel based approaches which depend on univariate statistical tests at specific voxel locations, PBM extracts multivariate patterns directly from the entire image. The advantage of this is that the inferences are not made locally as in VBM or DBM but globally. This allows the method to detect if combinations of voxels are better suited to separate the groups being studied rather than single voxels. Also the method is more robust to variations in the underlying registration algorithms as compared to typical DBM analysis

==== Surface-based morphometry ====
Once the brain is segmented, the boundary between different classes of tissue can be reconstructed as a surface on which morphometric analysis can proceed (e.g. towards gyrification), or onto which results of such analyses can be projected.

=== Diffusion-weighted MR-based brain morphometry ===
==== Fiber-tracking techniques ====
Nerve fiber-tracking techniques are the latest offspring of this suite of MR-based morphological approaches. They determine the tract of nerve fibers within the brain by means of diffusion tensor imaging or diffusion-spectrum imaging (e.g. Douaud et al., 2007 and O'Donnell et al., 2009).

== Diffeomorphometry ==
Diffeomorphometry is the focus on comparison of shapes and forms with a metric structure based on diffeomorphisms, and is central to the field of computational anatomy. Diffeomorphic registration, introduced in the 90's, is now an important player that uses computational procedures for constructing correspondences between coordinate systems based on sparse features and dense images, such as ANTS, DARTEL, DEMONS, LDDMM, or StationaryLDDMM. Voxel-based morphometry (VBM) is an important method built on many of these principles. Methods based on diffeomorphic flows are used in For example, deformations could be diffeomorphisms of the ambient space, resulting in the LDDMM (Large Deformation Diffeomorphic Metric Mapping) framework for shape comparison. One such deformation is the right invariant metric of computational anatomy which generalizes the metric of non-compressible Eulerian flows to include the Sobolev norm, ensuring smoothness of the flows. Metrics have also been defined that are associated to Hamiltonian controls of diffeomorphic flows.

== Applications ==
The qualitatively largest changes within an individual generally occur during early development and more subtle ones during aging and learning, while pathological changes can vary highly in their extent and interindividual differences increase both during and across lifetimes. The above-described morphometric methods provide the means to analyze such changes quantitatively, and MR imaging has been applied to ever more brain populations relevant to these time scales, both within humans and across species. Currently, however, most applications of MR-based brain morphometry have a clinical focus, i.e. they help to diagnose and monitor neuropsychiatric disorders, in particular neurodegenerative diseases (like Alzheimer) or psychotic disorders (like schizophrenia).

=== Brain development ===
MR imaging is rarely performed during pregnancy and the neonatal period, in order to avoid stress for mother and child. In the cases of birth complications and other clinical events, however, such data are being acquired. For instance, Dubois et al., 2008 analyzed gyrification in premature newborns at birth and found it to be predictive of a functional score at term-equivalent age, and Serag et al. built a 4D atlas of the developing neonatal brain which has led to the construction of brain growth curves from 28 to 44 weeks’ postmenstrual age. Beyond preterms, there have been a number of large-scale longitudinal MR-morphometric studies (often combined with cross-sectional approaches and other neuroimaging modalities) of normal brain development in humans. Using voxel-based and a number of complementary approaches, these studies revealed (or non-invasively confirmed, from the perspective of previous histological studies which cannot be longitudinal) that brain maturation involves differential growth of gray and white matter, that the time course of the maturation is not linear and that it differs markedly across brain regions. In order to interpret these findings, cellular processes have to be taken into consideration, especially those governing the pruning of axons, dendrites and synapses until an adult pattern of whole-brain connectivity is achieved (which can best be monitored using diffusion-weighted techniques).

=== Aging ===
While white matter increases throughout early development and adolescence, and gray matter decreases in that period generally do not involve neuronal cell bodies, the situation is different beyond the age of about 50 years when atrophy affects gray and possibly also white matter. The most convincing explanation for this is that individual neurons die, leading to the loss of both their cell bodies (i.e. gray matter) and their myelinated axons (i.e. white matter). The gray matter changes can be observed via both gray matter density and gyrification. That the white matter loss is not nearly as clear as that for gray matter indicates that changes also occur in non-neural tissue, e.g. the vasculature or microglia.

=== Learning and plasticity ===
Perhaps the most profound impact to date of brain morphometry on our understanding of the relationships between brain structure and function has been provided by a series of VBM studies targeted at proficiency in various performances: Licensed taxicab drivers in London were found to exhibit bilaterally increased gray matter volume in the posterior part of the hippocampus, both relative to controls from the general population and to London bus drivers matched for driving experience and stress levels. Similarly, gray matter changes were also found to correlate with professional experience in musicians, mathematicians and meditators, and with second language proficiency.

What is more, bilateral gray matter changes in the posterior and lateral parietal cortex of medical students memorizing for an intermediate exam could be detected over a period of just three months.

These studies of professional training inspired questions about the limits of MR-based morphometry in terms of time periods over which structural brain changes can be detected. Important determinants of these limits are the speed and spatial extent of the changes themselves. Of course, some events like accidents, a stroke, a tumor metastasis or a surgical intervention can profoundly change brain structure during very short periods, and these changes can be visualized with MR and other neuroimaging techniques. Given the time constraints under such conditions, brain morphometry is rarely involved in diagnostics but rather used for progress monitoring over periods of weeks and months and longer.

One study found that juggling novices showed a bilateral gray matter expansion in the medial temporal visual area (also known as V5) over a three-month period during which they had learned to sustain a three-ball cascade for at least a minute. No changes were observed in a control group that did not engage in juggling. The extent of these changes in the jugglers reduced during a subsequent three-month period in which they did not practice juggling. To further resolve the time course of these changes, the experiment was repeated with another young cohort scanned in shorter intervals, and the by then typical changes in V5 could already be found after just seven days of juggling practice. The observed changes were larger in the initial learning phase than during continued training.

Whereas the former two studies involved students in their early twenties, the experiments were recently repeated with an elderly cohort, revealing the same kind of structural changes, although attenuated by lower juggling performance of this group.

Using a completely different kind of intervention—application of Transcranial Magnetic Stimulation in daily sessions over five days—changes were observed in and near the TMS target areas as well as in the basal ganglia of volunteers in their mid-twenties, compared to a control group that had received placebo. It is possible, though, that these changes simply reflect vascularization effects.

Taken together, these morphometric studies strongly support the notion that brain plasticity—changes of brain structure—remains possible throughout life and may well be an adaptation to changes in brain function which has also been shown to change with experience. The title of this section was meant to emphasize this, namely that plasticity and learning provide two perspectives—functional and structural—at the same phenomenon, a brain that changes over time.

=== Brain disease ===
Brain diseases are the field to which brain morphometry is most often applied, and the volume of the literature on this is vast.

=== Brain evolution ===
Brain changes also accumulate over periods longer than an individual life but even though twin studies have established that human brain structure is highly heritable, brain morphometric studies with such a broadened scope are rare. However, in the context of disorders with a known or suspected hereditary component, a number of studies have compared the brain morphometry of patients with both that of non-affected controls and that of subjects at high risk for developing the disorder. The latter group usually includes family members.

Even larger time gaps can be bridged by comparing human populations with a sufficiently long history of genetic separation, such as Central Europeans and Japanese. One surface-based study compared the brain shape between these two groups and found a difference in their gender-dependent brain asymmetries. Neuroimaging studies of this kind, combined with functional ones and behavioural data, provide promising and so far largely unexplored avenues to understand similarities and differences between different groups of people.

Like morphological analyses that compare brains at different ontogenetic or pathogenetic stages can reveal important information about normal or abnormal development within a given species, cross-species comparative studies have a similar potential to reveal evolutionary trends and phylogenetic relationships. Indeed, shape comparisons (though historically with an emphasis on qualitative criteria) formed the basis of biological taxonomy before the era of genetics. Three principal sources exist for comparative evolutionary investigations: Fossils, fresh-preserved post-mortem or in vivo studies.

The fossil record is dominated by structures that were already biomineralized during the lifetime of the respective organism (in the case of vertebrates, mainly teeth and bones). Brains, like other soft tissues, rarely fossilize, but occasionally they do. The probably oldest vertebrate brain known today belonged to a ratfish that lived around 300 million years ago. While the technique most widely used to image fossils is computed tomography (CT), this particular specimen was imaged by synchrotron tomography, and recent MR imaging studies with fossils suggest that the method may be used to image at least a subset of fossilized brains.

MR images have also been obtained from the brain of a 3200-year-old Egyptian mummy. The perspectives are slim, however, that any three-dimensional imaging dataset of a fossil, semi-fossil or mummified brain will ever be of much use to morphometric analyses of the kind described here, since the processes of mummification and fossilization heavily alter the structure of soft tissues in a way specific to the individual specimen and subregions therein.

Postmortem samples of living or recently extinct species, on the other hand, generally allow to obtain MR image qualities sufficient for morphometric analyses, though preservation artifacts would have to be taken into account. Previous MR imaging studies include specimens preserved in formalin, by freezing, or in alcohol.

The third line of comparative evidence would be cross-species in vivo MR imaging studies like the one by Rilling & Insel (1998), who investigated brains from eleven primate species by VBM in order to shed new light on primate brain evolution. Other studies have combined morphometric with behavioural measures, and brain evolution does not only concern primates: Gyrification occurs across mammalian brains if they reach a size of several centimeters—with cetaceans dominating the upper end of the spectrum—and generally increases slowly with overall brain size, following a power law.
