= Sexual maturity =

Portion of a life cycle in which an organism is capable of sexual reproduction

Sexual maturity is the capability of an organism to reproduce.

Most multicellular organisms are unable to sexually reproduce at birth (animals) or germination (e.g. plants): depending on the species, it may be days, weeks, or years until they have developed enough to be able to do so; in addition, certain cues may trigger an organism to become sexually mature. These may be external, such as drought, or fire, that triggers sexual maturation of certain plants, or internal, such as percentage of body fat (certain animals). Internal cues are not to be confused with hormones, the chemical signals that initiate cellular processes leading to sexual maturity, but the production and secretion of hormones is triggered by such cues. In some species, immature males may delay sexual maturation in the presence of another sexually mature male, as in the male chicken (rooster), due to the intense, often lethal, combat engaged in by mature males. The female honeybee only becomes sexually mature if it is fed a special substance ("royal jelly") during the larval stage.

In humans, sexual maturity is related to both puberty and adulthood. Puberty is the biological process of sexual maturation, while adulthood, the condition of being socially recognized as an independent person capable of giving consent and taking responsibility, generally implies sexual maturity (certain disorders of sexual development notwithstanding), but depends on other criteria, defined by specific cultural expectations.

== Role of reproductive organs ==
Sexual maturity is brought about by a maturing of the reproductive organs and the production of gametes. It may also be accompanied by a growth spurt or other physical changes which distinguish the immature organism from its adult form. In animals these are termed secondary sex characteristics, and often represent an increase in sexual dimorphism.

After sexual maturity is achieved, some organisms become infertile, or even change their sex. Some organisms are hermaphrodites and may or may not be able to "completely" mature and/or to produce viable offspring. Also, while in many organisms sexual maturity is strongly linked to age, many other factors are involved, and it is possible for some to display most or all of the characteristics of the adult form without being sexually mature. Conversely it is also possible for the "immature" form of an organism to reproduce. This is called progenesis, in which sexual development occurs faster than other physiological development (in contrast, the term neoteny refers to when non-sexual development is slowed – but the result is the same - the retention of juvenile characteristics into adulthood).

== Puberty vs. sexual maturity ==
In some species, there is a difference between puberty and sexual maturity. For example, in bulls, puberty is characterized by the accelerated growth of the genital system, an increase in luteinizing hormone (LH) secretion, and the onset of spermatogenesis. Sexual maturity, however, signifies the attainment of full reproductive capacity, which may take up to 6–9 months after puberty.

== See also ==
- Gonadosomatic index
- Generation time
