= Gonadosomatic index =

Gonad mass as a proportion of the total body mass

In biology, the gonadosomatic index (GSI) is the calculation of the gonad mass as a proportion of the total body mass. It is represented by the formula:

GSI = [gonad weight / total tissue weight] × 100

It is a tool for measuring the sexual maturity of animals in correlation to ovary development and testicle development. The index is frequently used as reporting point in OECD test guideline, which may be used as indication or evidence of potential endocrine disruption effect of chemicals in regulatory framework (EFSA and ECHA, 2017).
