= Template generator =

Template or Template generating software is a tool used for developing website, email, and document templates without manually formatting or writing computer programming language code. Such tools provide a GUI (graphical user interface) for design purposes, and produce the source code or formatted structure for websites, emails, or documents.

== Categories of Template Generators ==
There are two types of template generators: online and desktop.

Online template generators allow users to design templates without downloading a tool onto their personal computer. Users must be online and make an account to begin using an online template generator, and sign in each time they use the tool.

Desktop template generators or desktop-based template generators, unlike online, have to be downloaded onto the user's computer. However, this eliminates the need to make an account and sign in before using the tool.

== CMS Theme Generators ==
CMS templates describe the web templates which are specifically made for use by websites built on content management systems. CMS templates can be categorized according to the number of CMSs available. On that basis, there are many generators which typically generate themes or templates for a particular CMS. The four major CMSs are:

- WordPress: The web design templates developed for the websites based on WordPress are called WordPress themes.
- Joomla: Templates developed for Joomla websites are called Joomla templates.
- Magento : Templates developed for Magento websites are called Magento themes.

== See also ==
- Page layout – Part of graphic design that deals in the arrangement of visual elements on a page
- Web template system – System in web publishing
