= Canonical analysis =

In statistics, canonical analysis (from Ancient Greek: κανων bar, measuring rod, ruler) belongs to the family of regression methods for data analysis. Regression analysis quantifies a relationship between a predictor variable and a criterion variable by the coefficient of correlation r, coefficient of determination r^{2}, and the standard regression coefficient β. Multiple regression analysis expresses a relationship between a set of predictor variables and a single criterion variable by the multiple correlation R, multiple coefficient of determination R^{2}, and a set of standard partial regression weights β_{1}, β_{2}, etc. Canonical variate analysis captures a relationship between a set of predictor variables and a set of criterion variables by the canonical correlations ρ_{1}, ρ_{2}, ..., and by the sets of canonical weights C and D.

== Canonical analysis ==
Canonical analysis belongs to a group of methods which involve solving the characteristic equation for its latent roots and vectors. It describes formal structures in hyperspace invariant with respect to the rotation of their coordinates. In this type of solution, rotation leaves many optimizing properties preserved, provided it takes place in certain ways and in a subspace of its corresponding hyperspace. This rotation from the maximum intervariate correlation structure into a different, simpler and more meaningful structure increases the interpretability of the canonical weights C and D. In this the canonical analysis differs from Harold Hotelling's (1936) canonical variate analysis (also called the canonical correlation analysis), designed to obtain maximum (canonical) correlations between the predictor and criterion canonical variates. The difference between the canonical variate analysis and canonical analysis is analogous to the difference between the principal components analysis and factor analysis, each with its characteristic set of commonalities, eigenvalues and eigenvectors.

== Canonical analysis (simple) ==
Canonical analysis is a multivariate technique which is concerned with determining the relationships between groups of variables in a data set. The data set is split into two groups X and Y, based on some common characteristics. The purpose of canonical analysis is then to find the relationship between X and Y, i.e. can some form of X represent Y. It works by finding the linear combination of X variables, i.e. X_{1}, X_{2} etc., and linear combination of Y variables, i.e. Y_{1}, Y_{2} etc., which are most highly correlated. This combination is known as the "first canonical variates" which are usually denoted U_{1} and V_{1}, with the pair of U_{1} and V_{1} being called a "canonical function". The next canonical functions, U_{2} and V_{2} are then restricted so that they are uncorrelated with U_{1} and V_{1}. Everything is scaled so that the variance equals 1.

One can also construct relationships which are made to agree with constraint restrictions arising from theory or to agree with common sense/intuition. These are called maximum correlation models. (Tofallis, 1999)

Mathematically, canonical analysis maximizes U′X′YV subject to U′X′XU = I and V′Y′YV = I, where X and Y are the data matrices (row for instance and column for feature).

== See also ==
- RV coefficient
