= Landmark point =

Distinguished points within shapes

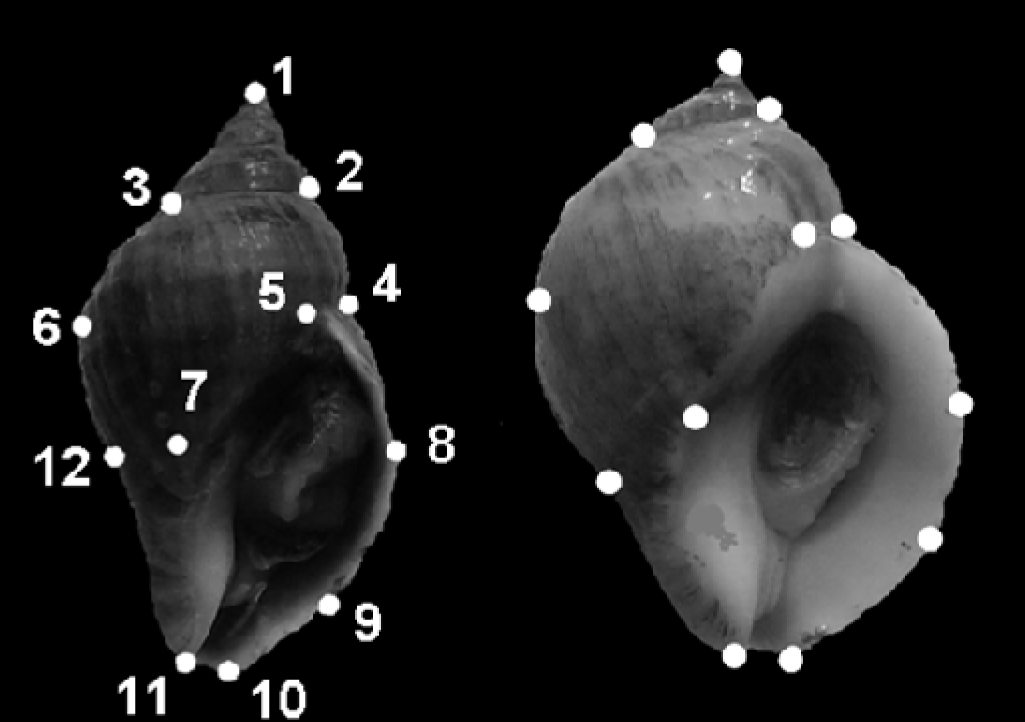
Position of landmark points (1-12), that were used for morphometric analysis of shells of Nucella lapillus.

In morphometrics, landmark point or shortly landmark is a point in a shape object in which correspondences between and within the populations of the object are preserved. In other disciplines, landmarks may be known as vertices, anchor points, control points, sites, profile points, 'sampling' points, nodes, markers, fiducial markers, etc. Landmarks can be defined either manually by experts or automatically by a computer program. There are three basic types of landmarks: anatomical landmarks, mathematical landmarks or pseudo-landmarks.

An anatomical landmark is a biologically-meaningful point in an organism. Usually experts define anatomical points to ensure their correspondences within the same species. Examples of anatomical landmark in shape of a skull are the eye corner, tip of the nose, jaw, etc. Anatomical landmarks determine homologous parts of an organism, which share a common ancestry.

Mathematical landmarks are points in a shape that are located according to some mathematical or geometrical property, for instance, a high curvature point or an extreme point. A computer program usually determines mathematical landmarks used for an automatic pattern recognition.

Pseudo-landmarks are constructed points located between anatomical or mathematical landmarks. A typical example is an equally spaced set of points between two anatomical landmarks to get more sample points from a shape. Pseudo-landmarks are useful during shape matching, when the matching process requires a large number of points.

== See also ==
- Statistical shape analysis
