= Voxel-based morphometry =

Computational neuroanatomy method

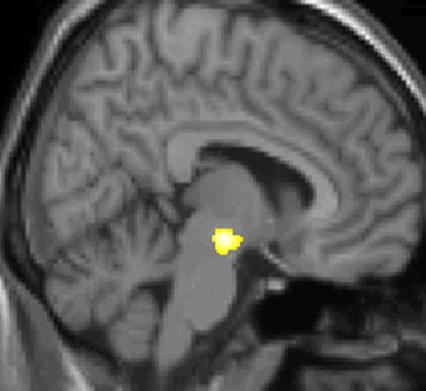
Example of a VBM analysis on patients who experience cluster headaches.

Voxel-based morphometry (VBM) is a computational approach to neuroanatomy that measures differences in local concentrations of brain tissue, through a voxel-wise comparison of multiple brain images. In traditional morphometry, volume of the whole brain or its subparts is measured by drawing regions of interest (ROIs) on images from brain scanning and calculating the volume enclosed. However, this is time consuming and can only provide measures of rather large areas. Smaller differences in volume may be overlooked. The value of VBM is that it allows for comprehensive measurement of differences, not just in specific structures, but throughout the entire brain. VBM registers every brain to a template, which gets rid of most of the large differences in brain anatomy among people. Then the brain images are smoothed so that each voxel represents the average of itself and its neighbors. Finally, the image volume is compared across brains at every voxel.

However, VBM can be sensitive to various artifacts, which include misalignment of brain structures, misclassification of tissue types, differences in folding patterns and in cortical thickness. All these may confound the statistical analysis and either decrease the sensitivity to true volumetric effects, or increase the chance of false positives. For the cerebral cortex, it has been shown that volume differences identified with VBM may reflect mostly differences in surface area of the cortex, rather than differences in cortical thickness.

== History ==
Over the past two decades, hundreds of studies have shed light on the neuroanatomical structural correlates of neurological and psychiatric disorders. Many of these studies were performed using voxel-based morphometry (VBM), a whole-brain technique for characterising differences in regional group volume and tissue concentration from structural magnetic resonance imaging (MRI) scans.

One of the first VBM studies and one that came to attention in mainstream media was a study on the structure of the hippocampus in London taxicab drivers. The VBM analysis showed that the posterior hippocampus was on average larger in the taxi drivers compared to control subjects while the anterior hippocampus was smaller. London taxi drivers need good spatial navigational skills and scientists have associated the hippocampus with this particular skill.

Another famous VBM paper was a study on the effect of age on gray and white matter volumes of 465 normal adults. The VBM analysis showed that overall, gray matter volume decreased linearly with age, especially for men, whereas white matter volume did not decline with age.

Computational statistical analysis methods are used to derive results from raw MRI data. Univariate and multivariate analysis and pattern recognition techniques can be employed in this regard. Multivariate analysis was used for classifying schizophrenic individuals from healthy individuals.

== For brain asymmetry ==
Usually VBM is performed for examining differences across subjects, but it may also be used to examine neuroanatomical differences between hemispheres detecting brain asymmetry. A technical procedure for such an investigation may use the following steps:

1. Construction of a study-specific brain image template with a balanced set of left and right handed and males and females.
2. Construction of white and grey matter templates from segmentation.
3. Construction of symmetric grey and white matter templates by averaging right and left cerebral hemispheres.
4. Segmentation and extraction of brain image, e.g., removal of scalp tissue in the image.
5. Spatial normalization to the symmetric templates
6. Correction for volume change (applying a Jacobian determinant)
7. Spatial smoothing (intensity in each voxel is a local weighted average generally expressed as GM, WM, CSF concentration).
8. Actual statistical analysis by the general linear model, i.e., statistical parametric mapping.

The outcome of these steps is a statistical parametric map, highlighting all voxels of the brain where intensities (volume or GM concentration depending on whether the modulation step has been applied or not) in a group images are significantly lower/higher than those in the other group under investigation.

== Compared to the region of interest approach ==
Before the advent of VBM, the manual delineation of region of interest was the gold standard for measuring the volume of brain structures. However, compared to the region of interest approach, VBM presents a large number of advantages that explain its wide popularity within the neuroimaging community. Indeed, it is an automated and relatively easy-to–use, time-efficient, whole-brain tool that could detect the focal microstructural differences in brain anatomy in vivo between groups of individuals without requiring any a priori decision concerning which structure to evaluate. Moreover, VBM exhibits comparable accuracy to manual volumetry. Indeed, several studies have shown good correspondence between the two techniques, providing confidence in the biological validity of the VBM approach.

== See also ==
- Brain morphometry
- Jacobian matrix and determinant
- Computational anatomy toolbox
