= BVF =

BVF or bvf can refer to:

== Companies and organizations ==
- Bahujan Volunteer Force, an arm of the Bahujan Samaj Party in India
- Belgian Video Federation, which merged with two other organizations to form the Belgian Entertainment Association
- Barbados Volunteer Force, the founding name of the Barbados Regiment, the land force of the Caribbean island of Barbados
- Brazilian Vale Tudo Fighting, which Brazilian martial artist Wanderlei Silva once fought a match in
- Biovail, a Canadian pharmaceutical company from 1991 to 2010, by stock ticker
- Bao Viet Fund, part of Vietnamese insurance company Bao Viet Holdings

=== Volleyball federations ===
- Bulgarian Volleyball Federation, an organization that governs volleyball in Bulgaria
- British Volleyball Federation, an organization that governs volleyball in the U.K.
- Bangladesh Volleyball Federation, which governs both the Bangladesh men's national volleyball team and the Bangladesh women's national volleyball team
- Volleyball Federation Of The Rep. Of Belarus, which governs the Belarus men's national volleyball team, the Belarus women's national under-19 volleyball team, and the Belarus women's national under-21 volleyball team

== Other uses ==
- Boundary vector field, a type of vector field used in computer vision
- Boor language, a language spoken in southern Chad, by ISO 639 code
- Beebe Hydrothermal Vent Field, a cluster of hydrothermal vents near Grand Cayman, Cayman Islands in the Caribbean
- Dama Airport, an airport in Bua, Fiji; see List of airports by IATA airport code: B
