= Michael Kass =

American computer scientist

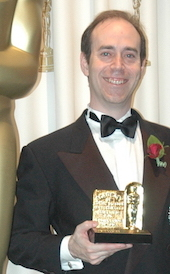
- Michael Kass receiving his Academy Award in 2006
- Education: Princeton University; Massachusetts Institute of Technology; Stanford University
- Awards: ACM Fellow; Academy Award for Technical Achievement; ACM SIGGRAPH Computer Graphics Achievement Award
- Scientific career
- Known for: Active contour model
- Fields: Computer graphics; Computer vision
- Workplaces: Nvidia; Intel; Magic Leap; Pixar; Apple, Inc.; Schlumberger Palo Alto Research

Michael Kass is an American computer scientist best known for his work in computer graphics and computer vision. He has won an Academy Award and the SIGGRAPH Computer Graphics Achievement Award and is an ACM Fellow.

Kass, David Baraff and Andrew Witkin shared an Academy Award for Scientific and Technical Achievement in 2005 for clothing animation, including his pioneering work on the clothing simulator used by Pixar in the short Geri's Game, Best Animated Short Film, Academy Awards 1997. He contributed a variety of technologies to Pixar animated films, from A Bug's Life through Monsters University.

In 2009, Kass was honored by ACM SIGGRAPH for "his extensive and significant contributions to computer graphics, ranging from image processing to animation to modeling, and in particular for his introduction of optimization techniques as a fundamental tool in graphics." The award citation notes: "Michael is a graphics renaissance man: he's worked on animation, modeling, textures, image processing and even on graphics systems. In each area, he's made groundbreaking contributions."

Google Scholar counts over 30K citations to his work, including one of the top 20 most cited papers in computer science, "Snakes: Active Contour Models," authored with Andrew Witkin and Demetri Terzopoulos. The "Snakes" paper launched the Active contour model, a framework for delineating an object outline from a possibly noisy 2D image for applications like object tracking, shape recognition, segmentation, edge detection and stereo matching.

Kass developed the Hierarchical Z-Buffer with collaborators Ned Greene and Gavin Miller, a rendering technique that enables great increases in practical scene complexity compared to traditional Z-buffering. The algorithm can be found in all modern graphics processing units (GPU).

Currently a distinguished engineer at NVIDIA, Kass is involved in a variety of projects related to augmented reality, virtual reality, and various types of content creation. Prior to NVIDIA, he was a senior principal engineer at Intel, a distinguished fellow at Magic Leap, a senior research scientist at Pixar, and a principal engineer at Apple Computers. His early days in advanced technologies began at Schlumberger Artificial Intelligence Research Laboratory after earning his Ph.D. from Stanford.

Kass has 28 issued U.S. patents and was honored in 2018 by the New York Intellectual Property Law Association as Inventor of the Year.

Kass is also a champion juggler, Argentine tango dancer, and an accomplished ice dancer.

== Education ==
Kass received a B.A. summa cum laude in artificial intelligence (independent concentration) from Princeton University, an M.S. in computer science from Massachusetts Institute of Technology and a Ph.D. in Electrical Engineering from Stanford University.

== Career ==
Michael Kass has been a distinguished engineer at NVIDIA since 2017. Prior to NVIDIA, he was a senior principal engineer in the New Technology Group at Intel, distinguished fellow at Magic Leap, a senior research scientist at Pixar Animation Studios, and a principal engineer with the Advanced Technology Group at Apple Computers. He began working on computer graphics and computer vision at Schlumberger's Palo Alto Research Center following his Ph.D.

== Honors, awards and achievements ==
=== Computer science ===
- Academy Award for Technical Achievement (2005), for "pioneering work in physically-based computer-generated techniques used to simulate realistic cloth in motion pictures," with David Baraff and Andrew Witkin
- SIGGRAPH Computer Graphics Achievement Award (2009), "for his extensive and significant contributions to computer graphics, ranging from image processing to animation to modeling, and in particular for his use of optimization for physical simulation and image segmentation"
- ACM Fellow (2017), "for contributions to computer vision and computer graphics, particularly optimization and simulation"
- New York Intellectual Property Law Association Inventor of the Year (2018), "for contributions to the field of computer graphics"
- Most Cited Paper in Computer Science - Citeseer (19th), for "Snakes: Active contour models," International Journal of Computer Vision (1988), with Demetri Terzopoulos and Andrew Witkin
- Helmholtz Award, International Conference on Computer Vision (2013), for "Snakes: Active Contour Models," ICCV 1987, with Demetri Terzopoulos and Andrew Witkin
- Golden Nica, Prix Ars Electronica (1992), with Andrew Witkin, for the image "Reaction Diffusion Texture Buttons," Linz, Austria
- Grand Prix, Pixel INA, Imagina (1991), for the animation Splash Dance, with G. Miller
- Marr Prize Honorable Mention, 1st International Conference on Computer Vision, London (1987), for "Snakes: Active contour models," with Demetri Terzopoulos and Andrew Witkin
- Best Paper in Perception-Vision, Association for the Advancement of Artificial Intelligence (1987), for "Energy constraints on deformable models: Recovering shape and non-rigid Motion," with Demetri Terzopoulos and Andrew Witkin
- Honorable Mention, Prix Ars Electronica (1987), for the animation Knot Reel, with Andrew Witkin and K. Fleischer.
- Nomination, Best Paper prize, Association for the Advancement of Artificial Intelligence (1986), for "Linear image features in stereopsis"
- Grand Prix, Parigraph (1986), for the animation Knot Reel, with Andrew Witkin and K. Fleischer

=== Other ===
- 2nd place, U.S. Argentine Tango Stage Championships, 2012
- U.S. Adult National Silver Medalist in ice dance, 2003
- U.S. Juggling Champion, 1980

== Notable publications ==
- M. Kass, A. Witkin and D. Terzopoulos, "Snakes: Active contour models," International Journal of Computer Vision, 1(4): 321–331, January 1988
- A. Witkin and M. Kass, "Spacetime constraints," Siggraph 1988: 159-168
- D. Terzopoulos, A. Witkin and M. Kass, "Constraints on deformable models: Recovering 3d shape and nonrigid motion," Artificial Intelligence, 35, 1988.
- M. Kass and A. Witkin, "Analyzing oriented patterns," Computer Vision, Graphics, and Image Processing, 37(3): 362–385, 1987
- T. DeRose, M. Kass and T. Truong, "Subdivision surfaces in character animation,' Siggraph 1998: 85–94.
- N. Greene, M. Kass and G. Miller, "Hierarchical Z-buffer visibility," Siggraph 1993: 231-238
- M. Halstead, M. Kass and T. DeRose, "Efficient, fair interpolation using Catmull-Clark surfaces," Siggraph 1993: 35-44
- M. Kass and G. Miller, "Rapid, stable fluid dynamics for computer graphics," Siggraph 1990: 49–57.
- D. Terzopoulos, A. Witkin and M. Kass, "Symmetry-seeking models and 3D object reconstruction," International Journal of Computer Vision, 1(3): 211–221, 1987.
- A. Witkin and M. Kass, "Reaction-diffusion textures," Siggraph 1991: 299-308
- A. Witkin, D. Terzopoulos and M. Kass, "Signal matching through scale space," International Journal of Computer Vision, 1(2): 133–144, 1987.
- D. Baraff, A. Witkin and M. Kass, "Untangling cloth," ACM Trans. Graph. 22(3): 862-870 (2003).

== Pixar film credits ==
- Geri's Game (short)
- A Bug's Life
- Toy Story 2
- Monsters, Inc.
- Finding Nemo
- The Incredibles
- Cars
- Ratatouille
- WALL-E
- Up
- Toy Story 3
- Monsters University
