= Facial motion capture =

Computer vision technology

Facial motion capture is the process of electronically converting the movements of a person's face into a digital database using cameras or laser scanners. This database may then be used to produce computer-generated imagery (CGI), computer animation for movies, games, or real-time avatars. Because the motion of CGI characters is derived from the movements of real people, it results in a more realistic and nuanced computer character animation than if the animation were created manually.

A facial motion capture database describes the coordinates or relative positions of reference points on the actor's face. The capture may be in two dimensions, in which case the capture process is sometimes called "expression tracking", or in three dimensions. Two-dimensional capture can be achieved using a single camera and capture software. This produces less sophisticated tracking, and is unable to fully capture three-dimensional motions such as head rotation. Three-dimensional capture is accomplished using multi-camera rigs or laser marker system. Such systems are typically far more expensive, complicated, and time-consuming to use. Two predominant technologies exist: marker and markerless tracking systems.

Facial motion capture is related to body motion capture, but is more challenging due to the higher resolution requirements to detect and track subtle expressions possible from small movements of the eyes and lips. These movements are often less than a few millimeters, requiring even greater resolution and fidelity and different filtering techniques than usually used in full body capture. The additional constraints of the face also allow more opportunities for using models and rules.

Facial expression capture is similar to facial motion capture. It is a process of using visual or mechanical means to manipulate computer-generated characters with input from human faces, or to recognize emotions from a user.

== History ==
One of the first papers discussing performance-driven animation was published by Lance Williams in 1990. There, he describes 'a means of acquiring the expressions of realfaces, and applying them to computer-generated faces'.

== Technologies ==
=== Marker-based ===
Traditional marker-based systems apply up to 350 markers to the actors face and track the marker movement with high resolution cameras. This has been used on movies such as The Polar Express and Beowulf to allow an actor such as Tom Hanks to drive the facial expressions of several different characters. Unfortunately, this is relatively cumbersome and makes the actors expressions overly driven once the smoothing and filtering have taken place.

Active LED Marker technology is currently being used to drive facial animation in real-time to provide user feedback.

=== Markerless ===
Markerless technologies use the features of the face such as nostrils, the corners of the lips and eyes, and wrinkles and then track them. This technology is discussed and demonstrated at CMU, IBM, University of Manchester (where much of this started with Tim Cootes, Gareth Edwards and Chris Taylor) and other locations, using active appearance models, principal component analysis, eigen tracking, deformable surface models and other techniques to track the desired facial features from frame to frame. This technology is much less cumbersome, and allows greater expression for the actor.

These vision-based approaches also have the ability to track pupil movement, eyelids, teeth occlusion by the lips and tongue, which are obvious problems in most computer-animated features. Typical limitations of vision-based approaches are resolution and frame rate, both of which are decreasing as issues as high speed, high resolution CMOS cameras become available from multiple sources.

The technology for markerless face tracking is related to that in a Facial recognition system, since a facial recognition system can Potentially be applied sequentially to each frame of video, resulting in face tracking. On the other hand, some recognition systems do not explicitly track expressions or even fail on non-neutral expressions, and so are not suitable for tracking. Conversely, systems such as deformable surface models pool temporal information to disambiguate and obtain more robust results, and thus could not be applied from a single photograph.

Markerless face tracking has progressed to commercial systems such as Image Metrics, which has been applied in movies such as The Matrix sequels and The Curious Case of Benjamin Button. The latter used the Mova system to capture a deformable facial model, which was then animated with a combination of manual and vision tracking. Avatar was another prominent motion capture movie; however, it used painted markers rather than being markerless.

Markerless systems can be classified according to several distinguishing criteria:

- 2-D versus 3-D tracking
- whether person-specific training or other human assistance is required
- real-time performance (which is only possible if no training or supervision is required)
- whether they need an additional source of information such as projected patterns or invisible paint such as used in the Mova system.

To date, no system is ideal with respect to all these criteria.

== Facial expression capture ==
=== Technology ===
Digital video-based methods are becoming increasingly preferred, as mechanical systems tend to be cumbersome and difficult to use.

Using digital cameras, the input user's expressions are processed to provide the head pose, which allows the software to then find the eyes, nose and mouth. The face is initially calibrated using a neutral expression. Then depending on the architecture, the eyebrows, eyelids, cheeks, and mouth can be processed as differences from the neutral expression. This is done by looking for the edges of the lips for instance and recognizing it as a unique object. Often contrast enhancing makeup or markers are worn, or some other method to make the processing faster. Like voice recognition, the best techniques are only good 90 percent of the time, requiring a great deal of tweaking by hand, or tolerance for errors.

Since computer-generated characters don't actually have muscles, different techniques are used to achieve the same results. Some animators create bones or objects that are controlled by the capture software, and move them accordingly, which when the character is rigged correctly gives a good approximation. Since faces are very elastic this technique is often mixed with others, adjusting the weights differently for the skin elasticity and other factors depending on the desired expressions.

=== Usage ===
Several commercial companies are developing products that have been used, but are rather expensive.

It is expected that this will become a major input device for computer games once the software is available in an affordable format, but the hardware and software do not yet exist, despite the research for the last 15 years producing results that are almost usable.

==== Communication with real-time avatars ====
The first application that got wide adoption is communication. Initially, video telephony and multimedia messaging, and later in 3D with mixed reality headsets.

With the advance of machine learning, computing power and advanced sensors, especially on mobile phones, facial motion capture technology became widely available. Two notable examples are Snapchat's lens feature and Apple's Memoji that can be used to record messages with avatars or live via the FaceTime app. With these applications (and many other) most modern mobile phones today are capable of performing real-time facial motion capture. More recently, real-time facial motion capture, combined with realistic 3-D avatars were introduced to enable immersive communication in mixed reality (MR) and virtual reality (VR). Meta demonstrated their Codec Avatars to communicate via their MR headset Meta Quest Pro to record a podcast with two remote participants. Apple's MR headset Apple Vision Pro also supports real-time facial motion capture that can be used with applications such as FaceTime. Real-time communication applications prioritize low latency to facilitate natural conversation and ease of use, aiming to make the technology accessible to a broad audience. These considerations may limit on the possible accuracy of the motion capture.

== See also ==
- Eye tracking
- Computer facial animation
- Deepfake
- Facial recognition system
- Facial Action Coding System
- Uncanny valley
