= Demetri Terzopoulos =

American professor of computer science

Demetri Terzopoulos FRS FRSC
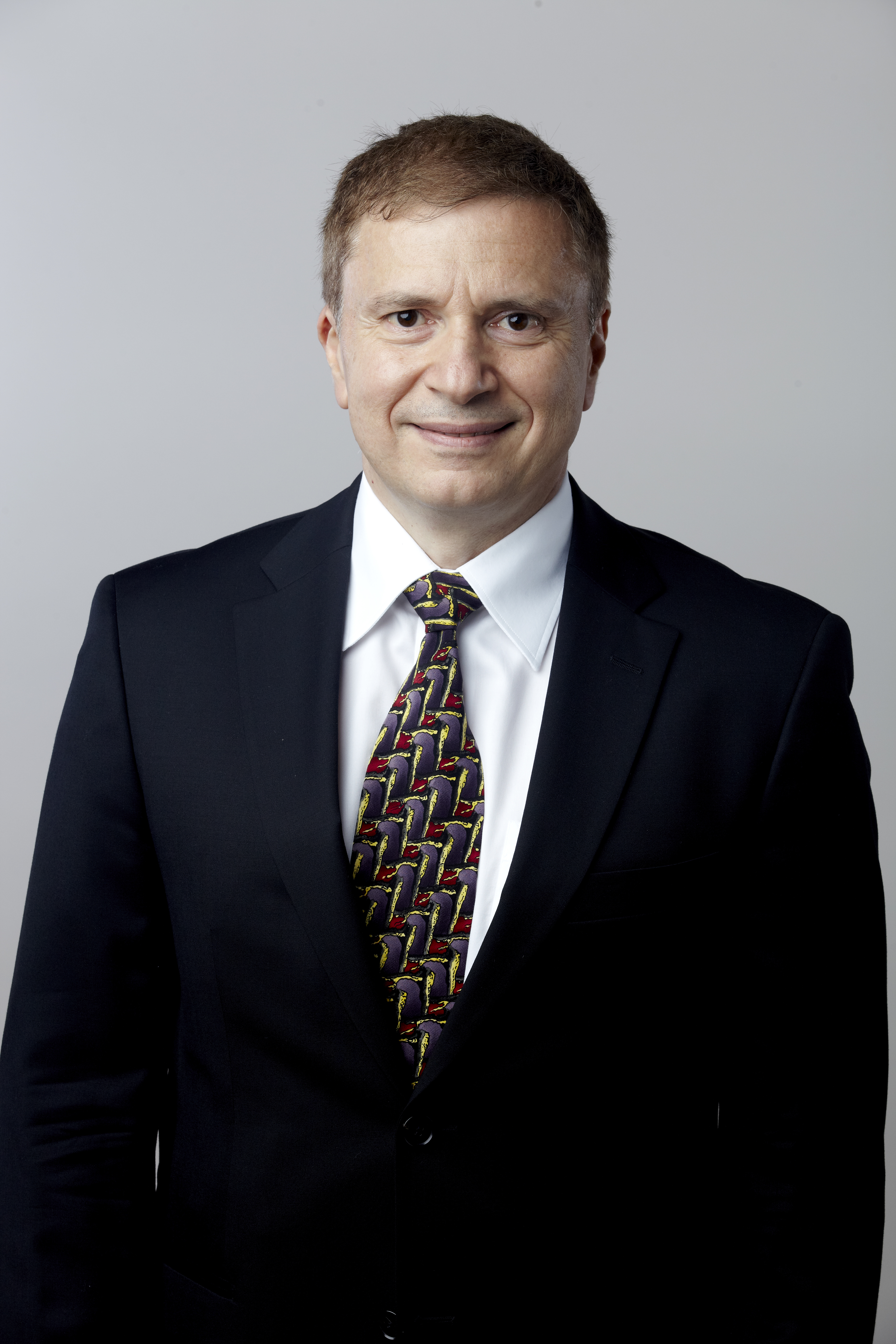
- Demetri Terzopoulos at the Royal Society admissions day in London, July 2014
- Awards: FRS, FRSC; ACM Fellow; IEEE Fellow; Guggenheim Fellow; IEEE Computer Pioneer Award; Academy Award for Technical Achievement; PAMI Distinguished Researcher Award; Helmholtz Prize
- Scientific career
- Education: MIT (PhD); McGill University (BEng, MEng)
- Known for: Deformable Models; Active Contour Models; Human and animal simulation
- Spouse: Noemi Terzopoulos
- Children: 2
- Fields: Computer graphics; Computer vision; Medical image analysis; Computer-aided design; Artificial intelligence/life
- Workplaces: University of California; New York University; University of Toronto
- Thesis: Multiresolution computation of visible-surface representations (1984)
- Doctoral advisors: Shimon Ullman; J. Michael Brady
- Website: terzopoulos.com

Demetri Terzopoulos FRS FRSC is a Greek-Canadian-American computer scientist and entrepreneur. He is currently a Distinguished Professor and Chancellor's Professor of Computer Science in the Henry Samueli School of Engineering and Applied Science at the University of California, Los Angeles, where he directs the UCLA Computer Graphics & Vision Laboratory.

== Education ==
Terzopoulos was educated at McGill University where he was awarded an Honours Bachelor of Engineering degree with Distinction in 1978 and a Master of Engineering degree, advised by Steven Warren Zucker, in 1980, both in electrical engineering. He went on to study at the Massachusetts Institute of Technology, where he was awarded a PhD degree in Artificial Intelligence in 1984 for computer vision research on the computation of visible-surface representations, advised by Shimon Ullman and J. Michael Brady. His university education was fully funded by two NSERC Canada and two Quebec government postgraduate scholarships in addition to two McGill University J.W. McConnell undergraduate scholarships.

== Career and research ==
Following his PhD studies, Terzopoulos was a research scientist at the MIT Artificial Intelligence Laboratory, a program leader at Schlumberger research centres in Palo Alto, California, and Austin, Texas, Professor of Computer Science and Professor of Electrical and Computer Engineering at the University of Toronto, and Professor of Computer Science and Mathematics at the Courant Institute of Mathematical Sciences of New York University, where he held a Lucy and Henry Moses Endowed Professorship in Science. He then moved to UCLA, where he has been Chancellor's Professor of Computer Science since 2005 as well as Distinguished Professor, the University of California's highest distinction for faculty members, since 2012.

Since 2016, Terzopoulos has been co-founder and chief scientist of VoxelCloud, Inc., a multinational healthcare AI company with offices in Los Angeles and Shanghai. He has held adjunct, visiting, consultancy, part-time, and internship positions at Schlumberger, IBM, Digital Equipment Corporation, Intel, Bell-Northern Research, the National Research Council of Canada, Ontario Tech University, Paris Dauphine University, and Shanghai Jiao Tong University.

Terzopoulos' research interests are primarily in computer graphics, computer vision, medical imaging, computer-aided design, and artificial intelligence/life. He has authored or co-authored more than 400 scientific publications, including several volumes, spanning these fields, 19 of which have been recognized with outstanding paper awards, and has delivered more than 500 invited talks worldwide about his research, among them well over 100 distinguished lectures and keynote/plenary addresses.

Terzopoulos has served on review and advisory committees at DARPA (United States), the National Science Foundation (United States), the National Institutes of Health (United States), the National Academies (United States), the Natural Sciences and Engineering Research Council (Canada), and the Max Planck Institute for Informatics (Germany).

== Awards and recognition ==
Terzopoulos was awarded a Guggenheim Fellowship in 2009. He is or was an ACM Fellow, a Fellow of the Institute of Electrical and Electronics Engineers (IEEE), a Fellow of the Royal Society (FRS) of London, a Fellow of the Royal Society of Canada (FRSC), a Fellow of the Canadian Institute for Advanced Research (CIFAR), a Distinguished Fellow of the International Engineering and Technology Institute (IETI), a Fellow of the Asia-Pacific Artificial Intelligence Association (AAIA), and a member of the European Academy of Sciences, the New York Academy of Sciences, Sigma Xi, and the Hellenic Institute of Advanced Studies (HIAS).

In 2020, the IEEE Computer Society awarded Terzopoulos its Computer Pioneer Award "for a leading role in developing computer vision, computer graphics, and medical imaging through pioneering research that has helped unify these fields and has impacted related disciplines within and beyond computer science".

Terzopoulos was elected a Fellow of the Royal Society (FRS) in 2014. His certificate of election and candidature reads:

Demetri Terzopoulos is an internationally renowned researcher in both computer vision and computer graphics and his work has helped to unify these two fields. He co-invented the seminal "active contours" algorithm, which is widely used in computer vision. He pioneered the development of deformable models and their application to vision and graphics, as well as to related domains such as medical imaging and computer-aided design. In the field of artificial life, his ground-breaking work combines biomechanics with theories of intelligence, including motor control, perception, behaviour, cognition and learning, to yield remarkably realistic computer simulations of humans and other animals.

In 2013, at the International Conference on Computer Vision (ICCV), Terzopoulos was awarded a Helmholtz Prize for his 1987 ICCV paper with Kass and Witkin entitled "Snakes: Active contour models", which received a Marr Prize citation in 1987.

In 2007, at the International Conference on Computer Vision (ICCV), Terzopoulos was awarded the inaugural IEEE PAMI Computer Vision Distinguished Researcher Award for his "pioneering and sustained research on deformable models and their applications". Deformable Models, a term he coined in his computer vision and graphics research work, is listed in the IEEE Thesaurus and IEEE Taxonomy (Systems engineering and theory → Modeling → Deformable models).

In 2006, at the 78th Academy Awards, Terzopoulos won an Academy Award for Technical Achievement from the Academy of Motion Picture Arts and Sciences with John Platt for "their pioneering work in physically-based computer-generated techniques used to simulate realistic cloth in motion pictures"; furthermore, their 1987 ACM SIGGRAPH Conference paper entitled "Elastically deformable models" was recognized by the academy as "a milestone in computer graphics, introducing the concept of physically-based techniques to simulate moving, deforming objects".

In 2006, Terzopoulos was elected a Fellow of the Royal Society of Canada by its Academy of Science, whose short citation reads:

Demetri Terzopoulos is an internationally renowned leader in computer vision and computer graphics whose work has contributed fundamentally to the ongoing unification of these two fields. He is famous for pioneering deformable models and for spearheading their application in vision and graphics, as well as in related domains such as medical imaging and computer-aided design.

In 2002, Terzopoulos was inducted as an inaugural Member of The European Academy of Sciences with the citation "Elected for outstanding and lasting contributions to computer science and pioneering developments in the field of computer vision"; he resigned from the academy in 2012.

Terzopoulos was awarded a Canadian Institute for Advanced Research (CIFAR) Artificial Intelligence and Robotics Fellowship (1989–1995), a Natural Sciences and Engineering Research Council of Canada E.W.R. Steacie Memorial Fellowship (1996–1998), and a Canada Council for the Arts Killam Research Fellowship (1998–2000). The Canadian Image Processing and Pattern Recognition Society (CIPPRS) cited him for his "outstanding contributions to research and education in Image Understanding" with its Young Investigator Award (1998) as well as with its Lifetime Achievement Award for Research Excellence (2015). The Canadian Human-Computer Communications Society (CHCCS) presented him with its Achievement Award (2023) for his "pioneering and sustained contributions to computer graphics over the course of nearly four decades". He is the recipient of six University of Toronto Faculty of Arts and Science Dean's Excellence Awards.

In 1973, Terzopoulos was awarded the Governor General's Academic Medal and Centennial Fund Scholarship by the High School of Montreal.

Terzopoulos' former students and postdocs have won significant awards for their work, among them the ACM Doctoral Dissertation Award in 1996 to Xiaoyuan Tu.

== See also ==
- Active contour model
