= Toyota Technological Institute =

University in Nagoya, Japan

- 豊田工業大学
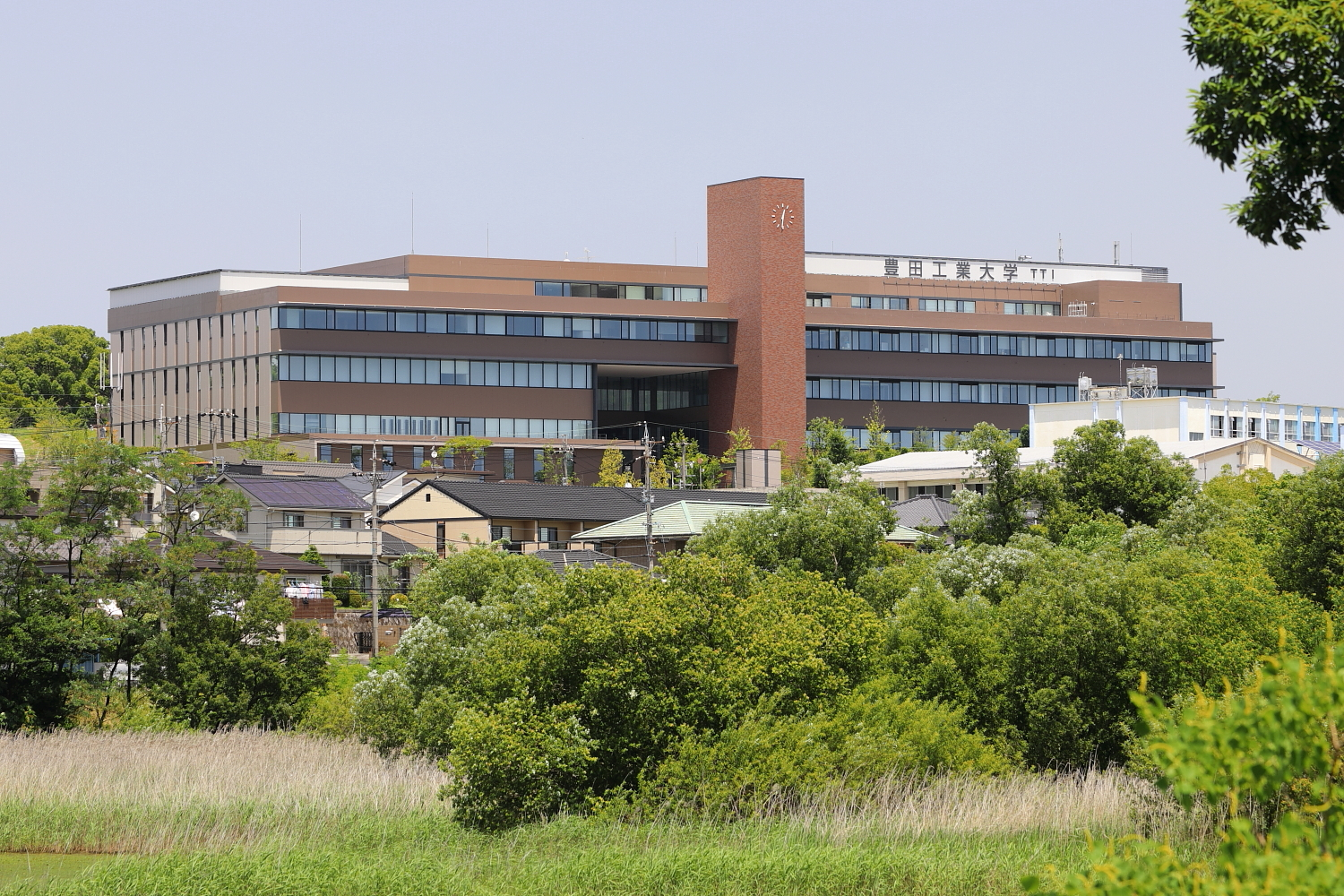
- Toyota Technological Institute (2020)
- Motto: 研究と創造に心を致し、常に時流に先んずべし
- Motto in English: Respect the spirit of research and creativity, and always strive to stay ahead of the times.
- Type: Private
- Established: 1981
- Academic staff: 35 (+ part time 48)
- Students: 454
- Undergraduates: 352
- Postgraduates: 101
- Location: Nagoya, Japan; 35.1065°N 136.9830°E
- Campus: Urban
- Website: toyota-ti.ac.jp

The Toyota Technological Institute (豊田工業大学, Toyota Kōgyō Daigaku) (commonly referred to as TTI) is a private university in Nagoya, Aichi Prefecture, Japan. Founded in 1981 by a large endowment from Toyota Motor Corporation, it originally only accepted students with some industrial work experience.

== Programs ==
TTI has a School of Engineering, a Master's Program, and a Doctoral Program. The programs consist of three areas of coursework: Mechanical Systems Engineering, Electronics & Information Science, and Materials Science & Engineering.

== Chicago campus ==
In 2003 Toyota also opened the Toyota Technological Institute at Chicago jointly with the University of Chicago. This campus is mainly for Ph.D. students, studying machine learning, algorithms and complexity, computer vision, speech technologies and computational biology.

== Reputation ==
TSU ranked TTI as the 5th best Japanese university in 2010 and 4th in 2011. In this ranking, TTI had the best employment rate among all Japanese Universities.

In 2012, TTI was ranked 1st in Asia in terms of average number of publication per faculty by the QS World University Rankings.
