= Toyota Technological Institute at Chicago =

Private college focused on computer science

- Other name: TTIC
- Type: Private graduate school
- Established: 2003
- Academic affiliations: University of Chicago
- President: Matthew Turk
- Location: Chicago, Illinois, United States; 41°47′05″N 87°35′34″W
- Website: www.ttic.edu

Toyota Technological Institute at Chicago (TTIC or TTI-Chicago) is a private graduate school and research institute focused on computer science and located in Chicago, Illinois, on the University of Chicago campus. It is supported by the earnings on an endowment of approximately $255 million as well as by the income from research awards received by its faculty.

== History ==
TTIC was founded by the Toyota Technological Institute (TTI), in Nagoya in Japan, a small private engineering school with an endowment provided by the Toyota Motor Corporation. TTI established TTIC as an independent computer science institute with the intention of creating a world-class institution. In addition to historical ties, there remains active collaboration between TTIC and TTI in Nagoya. However, TTIC has no formal ties with either TTI or the Toyota Motor Corporation.

TTIC officially opened for operation in September 2003 and three students entered its Ph.D. program in September 2004.

== Academics ==
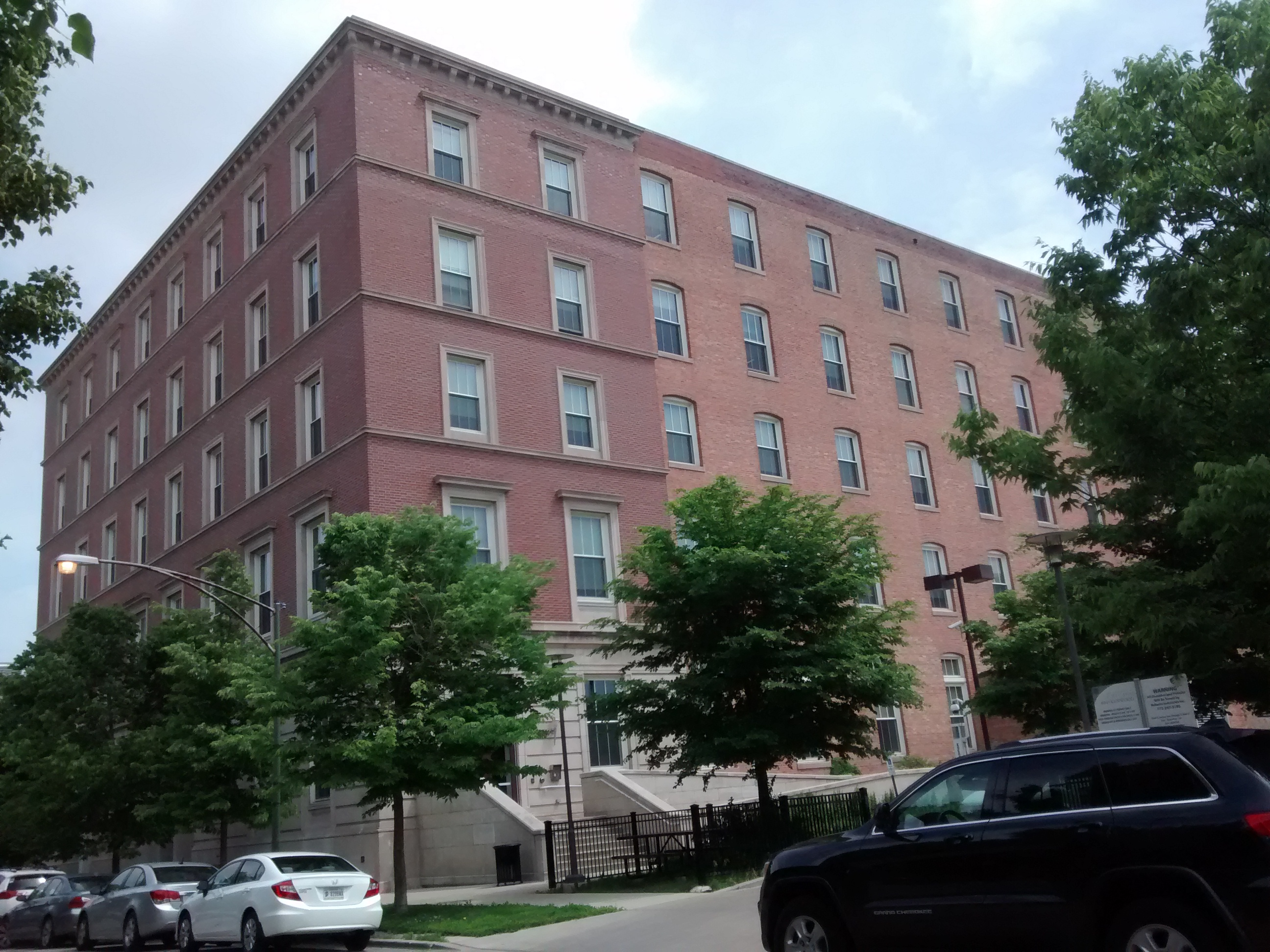
Toyota Technological Institute at Chicago

=== Research ===
TTIC focuses primarily on the following areas within computer science:

- Machine learning
- Theoretical Computer Science—Algorithms & Complexity
- Computer Vision
- Speech and Language Technologies
- Computational Biology
- Robotics

=== PhD program ===
TTIC offers a graduate program leading to a doctorate in computer science, with graduate students conducting research primarily within its areas of focus. TTIC has degree-granting authority in the state of Illinois and is accredited by the Higher Learning Commission.

== Relationship with University of Chicago ==
TTIC is located on the University of Chicago campus and has a close relationship with the University of Chicago Computer Science Department. An agreement between the University of Chicago and TTIC allows cross-listing of computer science course offerings between the two institutions, providing students from each institution the opportunity to register in the other's courses. Faculty and students enjoy full privileges of the university library system, athletic facilities, and other services.
