= Fellow of the Royal Society of Canada =

Award

Fellowship of the Royal Society of Canada
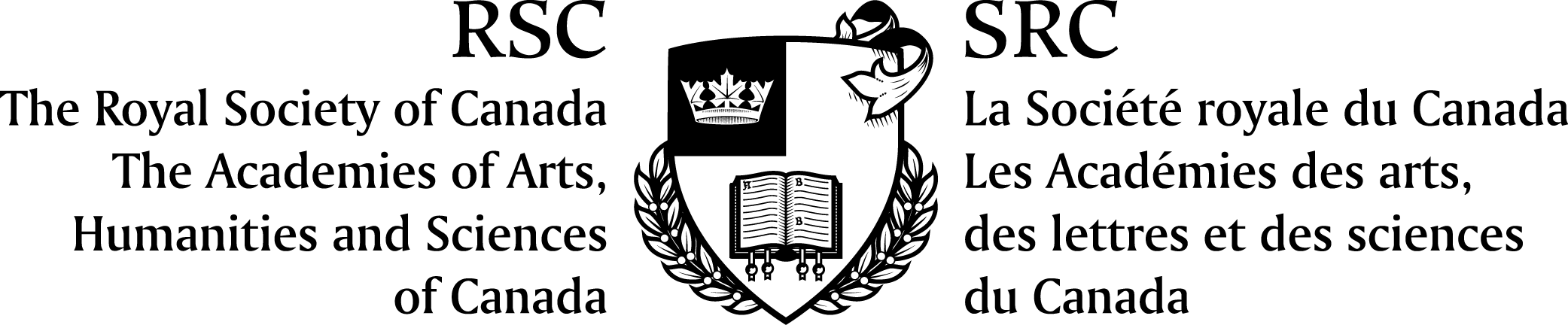
- Awarded for: "Remarkable contributions in the arts, the humanities and the sciences, as well as in Canadian public life"
- Sponsored by: Royal Society of Canada
- Date: 1882
- Country: Canada
- No. of fellows: 3,700+ (as of 2025)
- Website: rsc-src.ca

Fellowship of the Royal Society of Canada (FRSC) is an award granted to individuals that the Royal Society of Canada judges to have "made remarkable contributions in the arts, the humanities and the sciences, as well as in Canadian public life". As of 2026, there are more than 3,700 Canadian fellows, including scholars, artists, and scientists such as Margaret Atwood, Philip J. Currie, David Suzuki, Brenda Milner, and Demetri Terzopoulos. There are four types of fellowship:

1. Honorary fellows (a title of honour)
2. Regularly elected fellows
3. Specially elected fellows
4. International fellows (neither residents nor citizens of Canada)
