= Evelyn M. Witkin =

American geneticist (1921–2023)

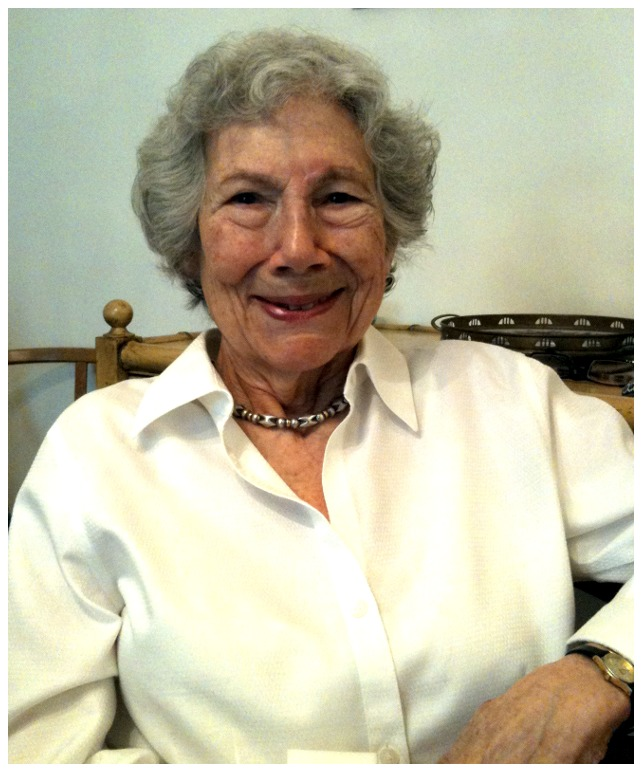
- Witkin in 2012
- Born: Evelyn Ruth Maisel; March 9, 1921; New York City, U.S.
- Died: July 8, 2023 (aged 102); Plainsboro Township, New Jersey, U.S.
- Education: Columbia University (PhD)
- Known for: Work on DNA mutagenesis and DNA repair
- Spouse: Herman Witkin (died 1979)
- Children: 2 (1 deceased), including Andrew
- Awards: Member of National Academy of Sciences; Thomas Hunt Morgan Medal (2000); National Medal of Science (2002); Lasker Award for Basic Medical Research (2015)
- Scientific career
- Fields: Bacterial genetics
- Workplaces: Columbia University; New York University; Rutgers University
- Thesis: Genetics of Resistance to Radiation in Escherichia Coli (1947)

Evelyn M. Witkin (née Maisel; March 9, 1921 – July 8, 2023) was an American bacterial geneticist at Cold Spring Harbor Laboratory (1944–1955), SUNY Downstate Medical Center (1955–1971), and Rutgers University (1971–1991). Witkin was considered innovative and inspirational as a scientist, teacher and mentor.

Her work on DNA damage and DNA repair in bacteria is foundational to our understanding of such processes in living organisms. Her work has direct application to the effects of aging and to the diagnosis and treatment of human diseases such as cancer. Witkin was awarded the National Medal of Science in 2002 for her pioneering work on DNA mutagenesis and DNA repair. In 2015, Witkin received the Albert Lasker Award for Basic Medical Research "for discoveries concerning the DNA-damage response - a fundamental mechanism that protects the genomes of all living organisms."

== Career ==
Witkin grew up in Queens, New York. She commuted to attend high school in Manhattan at Washington Irving High School, then an all-girls school, where she was encouraged to pursue her interest in science. Witkin earned a bachelor's degree from New York University in 1941, majoring in biology. She intended to remain there for graduate work, but after she helped to organize protests against the school's policy of not allowing black athletes to play at Southern colleges, she was suspended for three months and an offer for a graduate position was withdrawn.

After receiving her bachelor's degree, Witkin applied to Columbia University where she received her master's degree in 1943. She did her Ph.D. work with Theodosius Dobzhansky, who recommended her for Cold Spring Harbor Laboratory (CSHL). Witkin spent the summer of 1944 at CSHL, where she learned genetics techniques for working with bacteria, a new field of research. During her stay she isolated a UV radiation-resistant mutant of E. coli; this was the first time mutations conferring UV radiation-resistance were isolated. She returned to CSHL in 1945 and stayed there to complete her PhD research. Her degree was conferred in 1947.

After completing her degree she was employed by the Carnegie Institution of Washington to continue work at CSHL until 1955. Vannevar Bush, President of the Carnegie Institution, arranged for her to come in part-time after her children were born, an extremely unusual arrangement at that time. Witkin spent her official working hours in the lab, and did planning, data analysis and writing at home. In 1949, she was approached by Leo Szilard and Bernard Davis to organize and edit the Microbial Genetics Bulletin. Witkin edited the publication from 1950 to 1964.

From 1955 to 1971, Witkin worked at the State University of New York's Downstate Medical Center in Brooklyn. In 1971 Witkin was appointed Professor of Biological Sciences at Douglass College, Rutgers University. She was named Barbara McClintock Professor of Genetics in 1979, before moving to the Waksman Institute at Rutgers as Laboratory Director in 1983. She held that position until her retirement in 1991, when she became a professor emerita at Rutgers.

== Research ==
Before DNA was definitively identified as hereditary material, Witkin began to study central problems in genetics involving the duplication of genes and the mechanisms by which genetic changes propagate. When Witkin began her research, it was assumed that agents such as UV directly caused mutations that were responsible for developing resistance. Witkin and others discovered out that the bacteria actively responded to DNA damage in a variety of ways. Through these protective activities, bacteria were themselves shaping the genetic changes that occurred in responses to DNA damage.

During her first summer as a student at Cold Spring Harbor, Witkin worked with bacteria, which had recently been identified as having genes and being capable of viral resistance. Given that there were no published survival curves for the mutation of E. coli using ultraviolet light (UV), Witkin initially chose doses that turned out to be quite high. Most of her colonies died, but four survived on one plate. When compared to the parent strain, those bacteria showed a much higher tolerance to UV radiation. She also noted that there were differences in the strain's behavior compared to wild strains: the resistant strains did not display a delay before cell division and the development of elongated and filamentous strands, both of which were seen in UV-sensitive strains. Witkin was the first researcher to isolate a mutation conferring UV radiation-resistance.

While at Downstate, Witkin discovered that UV mutagenesis in E. coli could be reversed, a phenomenon she called "dark repair". She was the first to describe the processes of mutation frequency decline (MFD). She observed a decrease in damage-induced suppressor mutations when protein synthesis was transiently inhibited as a result of UV irradiation. Witkin concluded that MFD occurs as a result of rapid enzymatic repair before replication in cases where protein synthesis is inhibited or delayed. In the case of potentially mutagenic UV photoproducts (lesions), a failure to replicate is lethal to the bacterium. If another DNA polymerase is able to copy past an area of damage, the bacterium survives, but with a higher likelihood of errors having occurred during the DNA synthesis and repair.

In her 1967 paper, Witkin proposed that UV exposure blocked cell division by inhibiting a DNA replication enzyme that would introduce mutations during the replication process if it was left active. Mutants lacking excision repair processes were highly sensitive to the effects of radiation, and survivors of radiation exposure had many radiation-induced mutations. It was later determined that this type of excision repair is mediated in bacteria by a transcription-repair coupling factor (TRCF), which is produced by the MFD gene. In this and other research, Witkin inferred processes based on careful observation and experiment with populations of bacteria, that would only be directly observed and confirmed years later after the development of new technologies.

In 1970, Miroslav Radman, a recent graduate of the Free University of Brussels, circulated a memorandum to Witkin in which he proposed a model for "SOS replication". He theorized that sudden and extensive DNA damage could trigger an inducible stress response, genetically controlled and involving synthesis of new proteins. Witkin looked for evidence for a common control mechanism to underlie and explain the variety of cellular responses that she had observed in her work with UV mutagenesis in bacteria. She proposed that UV-damaged DNA generates a regulatory signal that activates a large number of genes. Her findings supported the idea of a control mechanism involving lexA, which normally represses SOS response genes, and recA, which eliminates lexA repression in response to DNA damage. Such an upregulation of proteins for DNA protection and repair represents a trade-off between accuracy of replication and immediate survival.

Witkin's research since the completion of her PhD was based on DNA mutagenesis, her mutagenesis work led to her work on DNA repair. Through this work she articulated the SOS response. Later, by characterizing the phenotypes of mutagenised E. coli, she and Radman detailed the SOS response to UV radiation in bacteria. Witkin continued to work on the mechanism of the SOS response until her retirement. The SOS response to DNA damage was a seminal discovery because it was the first coordinated stress response to be elucidated.

== Honors ==
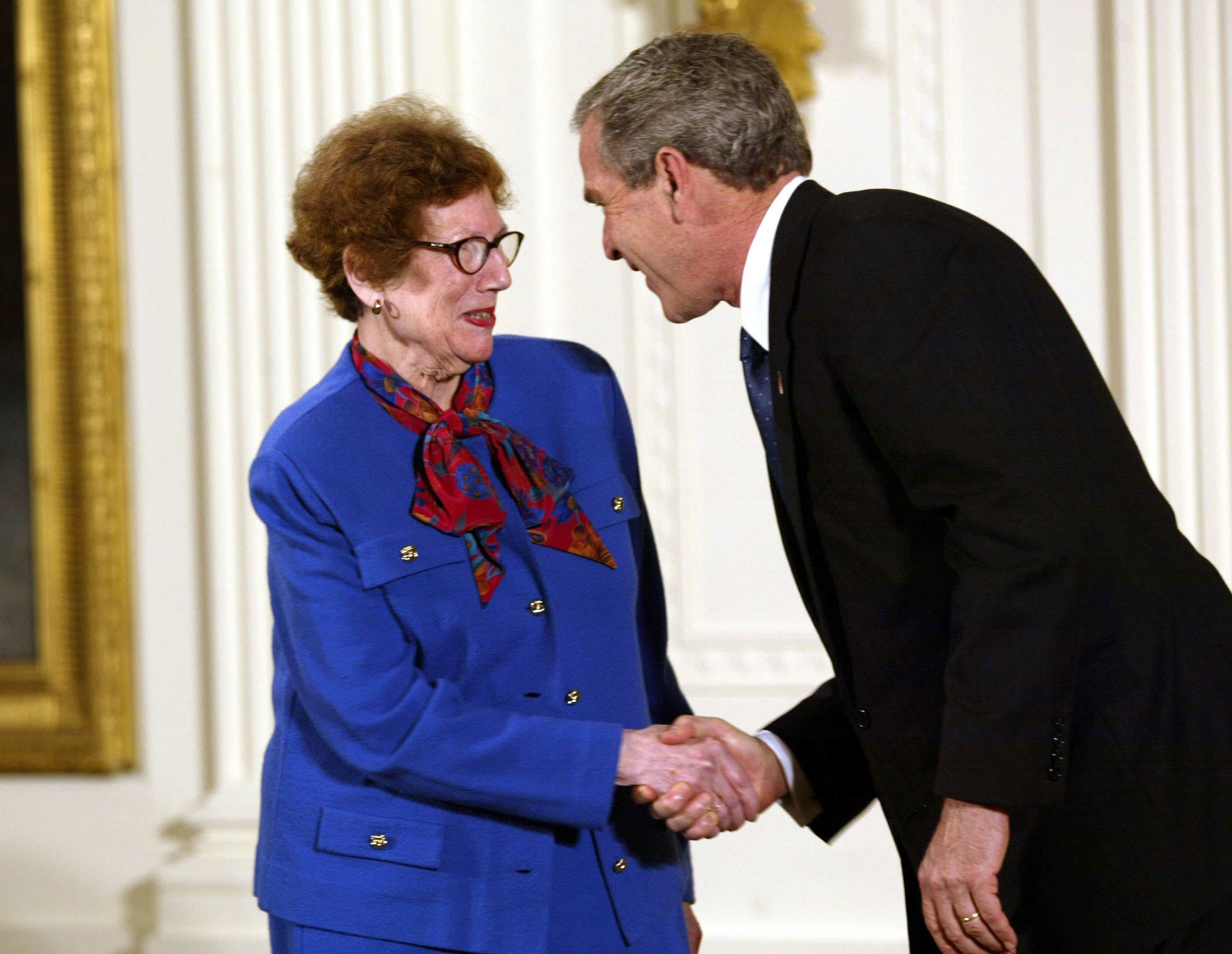
Evelyn M. Witkin receiving the 2002 National Medal for Science from President George W. Bush

Witkin was elected as a member of the National Academy of Sciences in 1977. At the time she was one of the few women elected to the Academy. She also became a Fellow of the American Academy of Arts and Sciences (1978), a Fellow of the American Association for the Advancement of Science (1980); and a Fellow of the American Academy of Microbiology. She was awarded the 2000 Thomas Hunt Morgan Medal and her contributions to science have been recognized by the United States government as she was awarded the National Medal of Science in 2002:

For her insightful and pioneering investigations on the genetics of DNA mutagenesis and DNA repair that have increased our understanding of processes as varied as evolution and the development of cancer.

In 2015, she was awarded The Wiley Prize in Biomedical Sciences and was named as one of The Forward 50. Also in 2015, Witkin won the Lasker Award for Basic Medical Research, with Stephen J. Elledge, "for discoveries concerning the DNA-damage response - a fundamental mechanism that protects the genomes of all living organisms."

In 2021, Rutgers University and the Waksman Institute of Microbiology held "Symposium Celebrating 100th Birthday and Research Accomplishments of Dr. Evelyn M. Witkin", a public symposium and dedication ceremony of a new research laboratory named after her. Kenneth Irvine, interim director of the Waksman Institute, said, "The laboratory is being named after Dr. Witkin because she was an outstanding scientist. But certainly it's important to note that she was a pioneering woman scientist, working at a time when science was dominated by men."

== Personal life ==
Evelyn Witkin was married to psychologist Herman Witkin; their sons were: Joseph Witkin, an emergency physician and founding member of Sha Na Na, and Andrew Witkin (d. 2010), a computer scientist. She was also the grandmother of four. She turned 100 in 2021.

Witkin died of complications from a fall in Plainsboro Township, New Jersey, on July 8, 2023, at the age of 102.

== Selected publications ==
- Witkin, Evelyn M. (March 1946). "Inherited Differences in Sensitivity to Radiation in Escherichia Coli". Proceedings of the National Academy of Sciences. 32 (3): 59–68. Bibcode:1946PNAS...32...59W. doi:10.1073/pnas.32.3.59. ISSN 0027-8424. PMC 1078880. PMID 16578194.
- Witkin, Evelyn M. (May 1964). "Photoreversal and "dark repair" of mutations to prototrophy induced by ultraviolet light in photoreactivable and non-photoreactivable strains of Escherichia coli". Mutation Research/Fundamental and Molecular Mechanisms of Mutagenesis. 1 (1): 22–36. Bibcode:1964MRFMM...1...22W. doi:10.1016/0027-5107(64)90049-1. PMID 14195747.
- Witkin, Evelyn M. (3 June 1966). "Radiation-Induced Mutations and Their Repair: Bacteria reduce the mutagenic effects of ultraviolet light by repairing DNA damaged by the radiation". Science. 152 (3727): 1345–1353. doi:10.1126/science.152.3727.1345. ISSN 0036-8075. PMID 5327888. S2CID 5851977.
- Witkin, E M (May 1967). "The radiation sensitivity of Escherichia coli B: a hypothesis relating filament formation and prophage induction". Proceedings of the National Academy of Sciences. 57 (5): 1275–1279. Bibcode:1967PNAS...57.1275W. doi:10.1073/pnas.57.5.1275. ISSN 0027-8424. PMC 224468. PMID 5341236.
- Witkin, Evelyn M. (December 1969). "Ultraviolet-induced mutation and DNA repair". Annual Review of Genetics. 3 (1): 525–552. doi:10.1146/annurev.ge.03.120169.002521. ISSN 0066-4197.
- Witkin, EM; George, DL (April 1973). "Ultraviolet mutagenesis in polA and UvrA polA derivatives of Escherichia coli B-R: evidence for an inducible error-prone repair system". Genetics. 73: Suppl 73:91-10. PMID 4576123.
- Witkin, E. M. (1976). "Ultraviolet mutagenesis and inducible DNA repair in Escherichia coli". Bacteriological Reviews. 40 (4): 869–907. doi:10.1128/MMBR.40.4.869-907.1976. PMC 413988. PMID 795416.
- Witkin, E. M. (1 February 1991). "RecA protein in the SOS response: milestones and mysteries". Biochimie. 73 (2): 133–141. doi:10.1016/0300-9084(91)90196-8. ISSN 0300-9084. PMID 1883877.
- Selby, C P; Witkin, E M; Sancar, A (15 December 1991). "Escherichia coli mfd mutant deficient in "mutation frequency decline" lacks strand-specific repair: in vitro complementation with purified coupling factor". Proceedings of the National Academy of Sciences. 88 (24): 11574–11578. Bibcode:1991PNAS...8811574S. doi:10.1073/pnas.88.24.11574. ISSN 0027-8424. PMC 53178. PMID 1763073.
- Witkin, Evelyn M. (October 2002). "Chances and Choices: Cold Spring Harbor 1944–1955". Annual Review of Microbiology. 56 (1): 1–15. doi:10.1146/annurev.micro.56.012302.161130. ISSN 0066-4227. PMID 12142497.
