= Truly Strong Universities =

Ranking of Japanese universities

The "Truly Strong Universities" (Japanese: 本当に強い大学, Hepburn: Hontōni Tsuyoi Daigaku) is a ranking of Japan's top 100 universities by publisher Toyo Keizai released annually in its business magazine of the same name.

There are several lists ranking Japanese universities, often called Hensachi, with most measuring them by their entrance difficulty, or by their alumni's successes. The Hensachi Rankings have been most commonly used as a reference for a university's rank.

Given this context, "Truly Strong Universities" (TSU) is a unique ranking system which ranks Japanese universities using eleven multidimensional indicators related to financial strength, education and research quality, and graduate prospects. It does not include any indicator of entrance difficulty. The system attempts to evaluate the university's strengths and the performance of its alumni, rather than students' prior academic abilities, or the brand of the college.

== History ==
Toyo Keizai first published the "TSU" rankings in 2000. Its initial aim was to analyze private universities as companies, and conduct a financial analysis of them, which had rarely been attempted before by other mass-media. It also tried to focus on a practical point of view such as business-academia collaboration, students' academic achievements, and career support.

In 2004, the ranking system was reorganized with more multidimensional factors to capture universities not only as business organizations but also as educational and research institutions. In 2005, the report began to analyze national universities; they have been included in the rankings since 2006.

== Methodology ==
The "TSU" ranking is designed to assess a university's strength as an organization. It uses eleven indicators in three categories. The eleven indicators contribute equally to the rankings after the calculation of standardized scores. "TSU" picked 181 major Japanese universities for its evaluation.

=== Financial strength ===
The financial strength concept consists of "Applicants' increasing ratio (%)", "Recurring profit margin (%)", "External fund gaining ratio (%)" and "Capital adequacy ratio (%)".

=== Education and research quality ===
Education and research quality is measured using "Spendings for education and research per income (%)", "Number of GP gainings", "Grants-in-Aid for Scientific Research (million yen)" and "Student/faculty ratio (%)".

=== Graduate prospects ===
Graduate prospects are evaluated using "Employment rate (%)", "Number of alumni as executives in listed companies in Japan" and "Average graduate salary at 30 years old (million yen)".

== Effects ==
As Toyo Keizai is one of 3 Japan's leading business magazines, this ranking system is well known in Japan. When it is released, several news resources frequently report the rankings, and many universities announce their ranking. In fact, sales of the magazine are higher than usual when the ranking is released. Toyo Keizai stated it has received many responses from readers.

Rankings such as Employment Rate and Average Graduate Salary, which is more practical for students than the overall rankings, is often cited.

Institution	Type	2008	2009	2010	2011	2012	2013	2014-15	2015-16
University of Tokyo	National	1	1	1	1	1	1	1	1
Waseda University	Private	5	5	6	6	7	6	3	2
Keio University	Private	2	2	2	3	3	3	2	3
Kyoto University	National	3	4	3	2	2	2	5	4
Tohoku University	National	7	6	7	8	6	7	7	5
Osaka University	National	4	3	4	5	5	4	4	6
Nagoya University	National	-	15	-	11	8	9	6	7
Toyota Technological Institute	Private	6	7	5	4	4	5	10	8
Kyushu University	National	14	8	8	12	15	10	8	9
Hokkaido University	National	9	10	14	10	11	12	10	10
Tokyo Institute of Technology	National	8	13	13	-	9	8	12	11
Hitotsubashi University	National	11	18	17	7	12	11	13	12
Chiba University	National	18	17	-	-	-	-	15	13
University of Tsukuba	National	15	-	16	19	-	-	17	14
Meiji University	Private	-	19	-	-	-	-	-	15
Akita International University	Public	-	-	-	-	16	-	14	16
Kobe University	National	-	12	10	13	18	14	18	17
Tokyo University of Agriculture and Technology	National	20	-	-	-	-	-	-	18
Sophia University	Private	-	-	-	-	-	-	-	18
Tokyo University of Foreign Studies	National	-	-	20	-	-	-	-	20
Gunma University of Health and Welfare	Private	-	-	-	-	12	-	-	-
Nagoya City University	Public	13	-	12	9	-	-	-	-
Aomori Chuo Gakuin University	Private	-	-	-	-	-	-	9	-
Juntendo University	Private	-	-	-	-	16	13	19	-
Wakayama Medical University	Public	-	-	-	-	19	-	-	-
Jikei University School of Medicine	Private	-	-	-	-	20	-	-	-
Osaka City University	Public	-	-	-	14	-	19	-	-
Kitasato University	Private	-	9	9	15	-	-	-	-
Sōka University	Private	17	-	-	16	14	15	-	-
Jichi Medical University	Private	-	-	-	-	-	16	-	-
Kochi University of Technology	Public	-	-	-	-	-	18	-	-
Tokyo Dental College	Private	-	-	-	-	-	20	-	-
Tokai University	Private	-	-	-	-	-	16	-	-
Gifu University	National	-	-	-	17	-	-	-	-
University of Miyazaki	National	-	-	-	18	-	-	-	-
Hiroshima University	National	16	20	15	20	-	-	-	-
Musashino University	Private	10	-	-	-	-	-	-	-
Tohoku Fukushi University	Private	-	16	-	-	-	-	-	-
Kwansei Gakuin University	Private	-	-	11	-	-	-	-	-
Tokyo Denki University	Private	-	-	-	-	10	-	-	-
Doshisha University	Private	12	14	18	-	-	-	-	-
Shibaura Institute of Technology	Private	-	-	19	-	-	-	-	-
Meikai University	Private	-	-	-	-	-	-	16	-
Tsuda College	Private	-	11	-	-	-	-	-	-
Tokyo Medical University	Private	-	-	-	-	-	-	20	-
Kanazawa Institute of Technology	Private	19	-	-	-	-	-	-	-

== Criticisms ==
Toyo Keizai admitted that the ranking system has three main problems. First, the ranking has a tendency to be affected by single-year factors such as the gain of capital by the sale of assets. Because of this, it is recommended that readers look at the ranking of each university over the course of several years. Second, the value of university's brand is not reflected in the rankings. For this reason, some prestigious universities are placed in what would be considered lower positions. Third, there are no individual categories, such as private or public schools. As such, the universities' individual characteristics and strengths are not adequately considered. Furthermore, the total amount spent per student does not include labor costs, thereby improperly evaluating the Liberal Arts Colleges which spend significant amounts on labor (e.g. International Christian University).
