= Bahujan Volunteer Force =

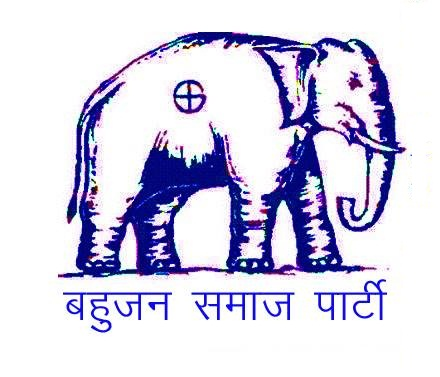
- Region served: India
- Website: No website

The Bahujan Volunteer Force or BVF are volunteers, both men and women mostly youth among party workers belonging to Bahujan Samaj Party. They are mainly used for Crowd control as well as managing party rallies and averting violence during the programmes of the party. Keeping in mind the vastness of the party affairs and with a view to conduct the organizational affairs effectively these volunteers are trained to deal with the crowds. The BSP is known for its discipline due to BVF as they make party’s rallies are well organised. The BVF has blue and white uniform with a cap that has the BSP emblem. BSP workers are between 18 and 40 years old are members of BVF. BVF is headed by a Vidhan Sabha convenor and co-convenor at the level of Assembly constituency and by a district convenor and a co-convenor at the district level. BVF has 2000 volunteers in Delhi, including 600 women, and more than 28000 volunteers nationwide.
