= Matthew Turk =

President of the Toyota Technological Institute at Chicago

Matthew Turk is a professor emeritus and former department chair of the Department of Computer Science and the Media Arts and Technology Program at the University of California, Santa Barbara, California. He was the President of the Toyota Technological Institute at Chicago for six years, ending in August 2025. He was named a Fellow of the Institute of Electrical and Electronics Engineers (IEEE) in 2013 for his contributions to computer vision and perceptual interfaces. In 2014, Turk was also named a Fellow of the International Association for Pattern Recognition (IAPR) for his contributions to computer vision and vision based interaction. In January 2021, he was named a Fellow of the Association for Computing Machinery (ACM) for contributions to face recognition, computer vision, and multimodal interaction. Matthew Turk served in the Steering Committee of ACM International Conference on Multimodal Interaction between 2002 and 2015, and chaired the committee between 2007 and 2009. He received the ICMI Community Service Award in 2014.

Turk received a PhD at the MIT Media Lab in 1991.
