= Boundary vector field =

Animation terminology

The boundary vector field (BVF) is an external force for parametric active contours (i.e. Snakes). In the fields of computer vision and image processing, parametric active contours are widely used for segmentation and object extraction. The active contours move progressively towards its target based on the external forces. There are a number of shortcomings in using the traditional external forces, including the capture range problem, the concave object extraction problem, and high computational requirements.

The BVF is generated by an interpolation scheme which reduces the computational requirement significantly, and at the same time, improves the capture range and concave object extraction capability.

The BVF is also tested in moving object tracking and is proven to provide fast detection method for real time video applications.
