= Andrew Witkin =

American computer scientist (1952–2010)

Andy Witkin
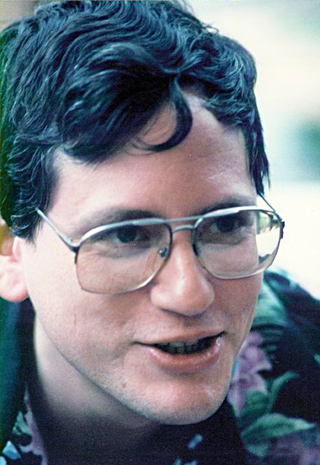
- Witkin in 1987
- Born: Andrew Paul Witkin; July 22, 1952
- Died: September 12, 2010 (aged 58); Monterey, California, U.S.
- Education: Columbia University (BA); Massachusetts Institute of Technology (PhD)
- Known for: Toy Story 3
- Spouse: Sharon Witkin
- Children: 2
- Awards: Prix Ars Electronica (1992)
- Scientific career
- Workplaces: Schlumberger; Pixar; Carnegie Mellon University
- Thesis: Shape from Contour (1980)
- Doctoral advisor: Whitman Albin Richards
- Website: www.cs.cmu.edu/~aw

Andrew Paul Witkin (July 22, 1952 – September 12, 2010) was an American computer scientist who made major contributions in computer vision and computer graphics.

== Education ==
Witkin studied psychology at Columbia College, Columbia University, for his bachelor's degree, and at MIT for his Ph.D. supervised by Whitman A. Richards.

== Career ==
After MIT, Witkin worked briefly at SRI International on computer vision. He then moved to Schlumberger's Fairchild Laboratory for Artificial Intelligence Research, later Schlumberger Palo Alto Research, where he led research in computer vision and graphics; here he invented scale-space filtering, scale-space segmentation and Active Contour Models and published several prize-winning papers.

From 1988 to 1998, he was a professor of computer science, robotics, and art at Carnegie Mellon University, after which he joined Pixar in Emeryville, California. At CMU and Pixar, with his colleagues he developed the methods and simulators used to model and render natural-looking cloth, hair, water, and other complex aspects of modern computer animation.

== Awards and honors ==
The paper "Snakes: Active Contour Models" achieved an honorable mention for the Marr Prize in 1987. According to CiteSeer, this paper is the 11th most cited paper ever in computer science. The 1987 paper "Constraints on deformable models: Recovering 3D shape and nonrigid motion" was also a prize winner.

He was a Founding Fellow of the Association for the Advancement of Artificial Intelligence. In 1992, Witkin and Kass were awarded the Prix Ars Electronica computer graphics award for "Reaction–Diffusion Textures."

Witkin received the ACM SIGGRAPH Computer Graphics Achievement Award in 2001 "for his pioneering work in bringing a physics based approach to computer graphics."

As senior scientist at Pixar, Witkin received a technical Academy Award in 2006 for "pioneering work in physically based computer-generated techniques used to simulate realistic cloth in motion pictures."

== Personal life ==
Andrew Witkin was the son of psychologist Herman Witkin and geneticist Evelyn M. Witkin. He was married to psychologist Sharon Witkin; they had two children.

== Death ==
He died in a scuba diving accident off the coast of Monterey, California, on September 12, 2010. The 2011 film, Cars 2 was dedicated in his memory along with Japeth Pieper in the credits.
