= Active appearance model =

An active appearance model (AAM) is a computer vision algorithm for matching a statistical model of object shape and appearance to a new image. They are built during a training phase. A set of images, together with coordinates of landmarks that appear in all of the images, is provided to the training supervisor.

The model was first introduced by Edwards, Cootes and Taylor in the context of face analysis at the 3rd International Conference on Face and Gesture Recognition, 1998. Cootes, Edwards and Taylor further described the approach as a general method in computer vision at the European Conference on Computer Vision in the same year. The approach is widely used for matching and tracking faces and for medical image interpretation.

The algorithm uses the difference between the current estimate of appearance and the target image to drive an optimization process. By taking advantage of the least squares techniques, it can match to new images very swiftly.

It is related to the active shape model (ASM). One disadvantage of ASM is that it only uses shape constraints (together with some information about the image structure near the landmarks), and does not take advantage of all the available information – the texture across the target object. This can be modelled using an AAM.

== Some reading ==
- T. F. Cootes, C. J. Taylor, D. H. Cooper, and J. Graham. Training models of shape from sets of examples. In Proceedings of BMVC'92, pages 266–275, 1992
- S. C. Mitchell, J. G. Bosch, B. P. F. Lelieveldt, R. J. van der Geest, J. H. C. Reiber, and M. Sonka. 3-d active appearance models: Segmentation of cardiac MR and ultrasound images. IEEE Trans. Med. Imaging, 21(9):1167–1178, 2002
- T.F. Cootes, G. J. Edwards, and C. J. Taylor. Active appearance models. ECCV, 2:484–498, 1998[pdf]
