= Procrustes transformation =

Geometric operation

A Procrustes transformation is a geometric transformation that involves only translation, rotation, uniform scaling, or a combination of these transformations. Hence, it may change the size, position, and orientation of a geometric object, but not its shape.

The Procrustes transformation is named after the mythical Greek robber Procrustes who made his victims fit his bed either by stretching their limbs or cutting them off.

== See also ==
- Procrustes analysis
- Orthogonal Procrustes problem
- Singular value decomposition
- Affine transformation, which also allows for shear
