= Free-choice profiling =

Method for determing quality

Free-choice profiling is a method for determining the quality of a thing by having a large number of subjects experience (view, taste, read, etc.) it and then allowing them to describe the thing in their own words, as opposed to posing them a set of "yes-no-maybe" questions. All of the descriptions are then analyzed to determine a "consensus configuration" of qualities, usually through Generalized Procrustes analysis (GPA) or Multiple factor analysis (MFA).

Free-choice profiling first emerged in 1984, but the original published model has been modified by researchers into variations that are more applicable to their particular use. For example, a technique employed by Jean Marc Sieffermann combined it with flash profiling, specifically using the free-profiling strategy of individual panelist vocabulary generation. The method allows panelists to freely develop their own descriptors and scales. A study shows that free-choice profiling can provide more accurate sample maps compared with other methodologies, such as project mapping and free sorting in the area of sensory characterization.

== Sources ==
- Raw Hop Aroma Qualities by Trained Panel Free-Choice Profiling, Gregory J. Stucky and Mina R. McDaniel, available on-line
