= Generalized Procrustes analysis =

Method of statistical analysis

Generalized Procrustes analysis (GPA) is a method of statistical analysis that can be used to compare the shapes of objects, or the results of surveys, interviews, or panels. It was developed for analysing the results of free-choice profiling, a survey technique which allows respondents (such as sensory panelists) to describe a range of products in their own words or language. GPA is one way to make sense of free-choice profiling data; other ways can be multiple factor analysis (MFA), or the STATIS method. The method was first published by J. C. Gower in 1975.

Generalized Procrustes analysis estimates the scaling factor applied to respondent scale usage, generating a weighting factor that is used to compensate for individual scale usage differences. Unlike measures such as a principal component analysis, GPA uses individual level data and a measure of variance is utilized in the analysis.

The Procrustes distance provides a metric to minimize in order to superimpose a pair of shape instances annotated by landmark points. GPA applies the Procrustes analysis method to superimpose a population of shapes instead of only two shape instances.

The algorithm outline is the following:

1. arbitrarily choose a reference shape (typically by selecting it among the available instances)
2. superimpose all instances to current reference shape
3. compute the mean shape of the current set of superimposed shapes
4. if the Procrustes distance between the mean shape and the reference is above a certain threshold, set the reference to mean shape and continue to step 2.

== See also ==
- Procrustes analysis
- Orthogonal Procrustes problem
