= Procrustes =

Character in Greek mythology

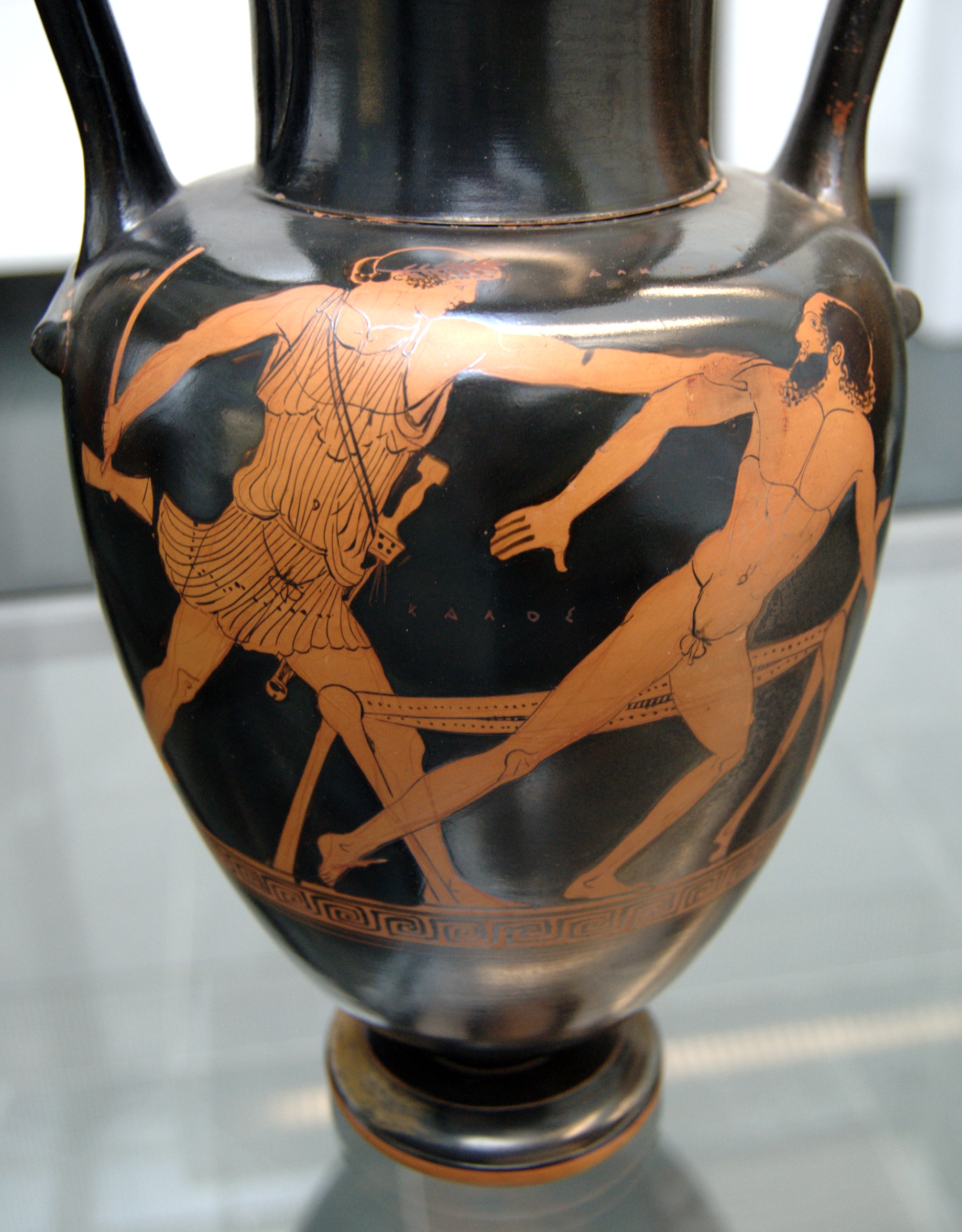
Theseus and Procrustes, Attic red-figure neck-amphora, 470–460 BC, Staatliche Antikensammlungen (Inv. 2325)

In Greek mythology, Procrustes (/proʊˈkrʌstiːz/; Greek: Προκρούστης Prokroustes, "the stretcher [who hammers out the metal]"), also known as Prokoptas, Damastes (Δαμαστής, "subduer") or Polypemon, was a rogue smith and bandit from Attica who attacked people by stretching them or cutting off their legs, so as to force them to fit the size of an iron bed.

The word Procrustean is thus used by analogy to describe, for example, situations where an arbitrary standard is used to measure success, while completely disregarding obvious harm that results from the effort.

== Family ==
Procrustes was a son of Poseidon while his mother was unknown. Procrustes had a son named Sinis, by Sylea (daughter of Corinthus), who, just as his father, came to be another malefactor captured and killed by Theseus.

== Mythology ==
Procrustes had a stronghold on Mount Korydallos at Erineus, on the sacred way between Athens and Eleusis. There he had a bed, in which he invited every passer-by to spend the night, and where he set to work on them with his smith's hammer, to stretch them to fit. In later tellings, if the guest proved too tall, Procrustes would amputate the excess length; if the guest was too short Procrustes would stretch them until they died; nobody ever fit the bed exactly. Procrustes continued his reign of terror until he was captured by Theseus, travelling to Athens along the sacred way, who "fitted" Procrustes to his own bed:

He killed Damastes, surnamed Procrustes, by compelling him to make his own body fit his bed, as he had been wont to do with those of strangers. And he did this in imitation of Heracles. For that hero punished those who offered him violence in the manner in which they had plotted to serve him.

Killing Procrustes was Theseus's last adventure on his journey from Troezen to Athens.

== Cultural references ==
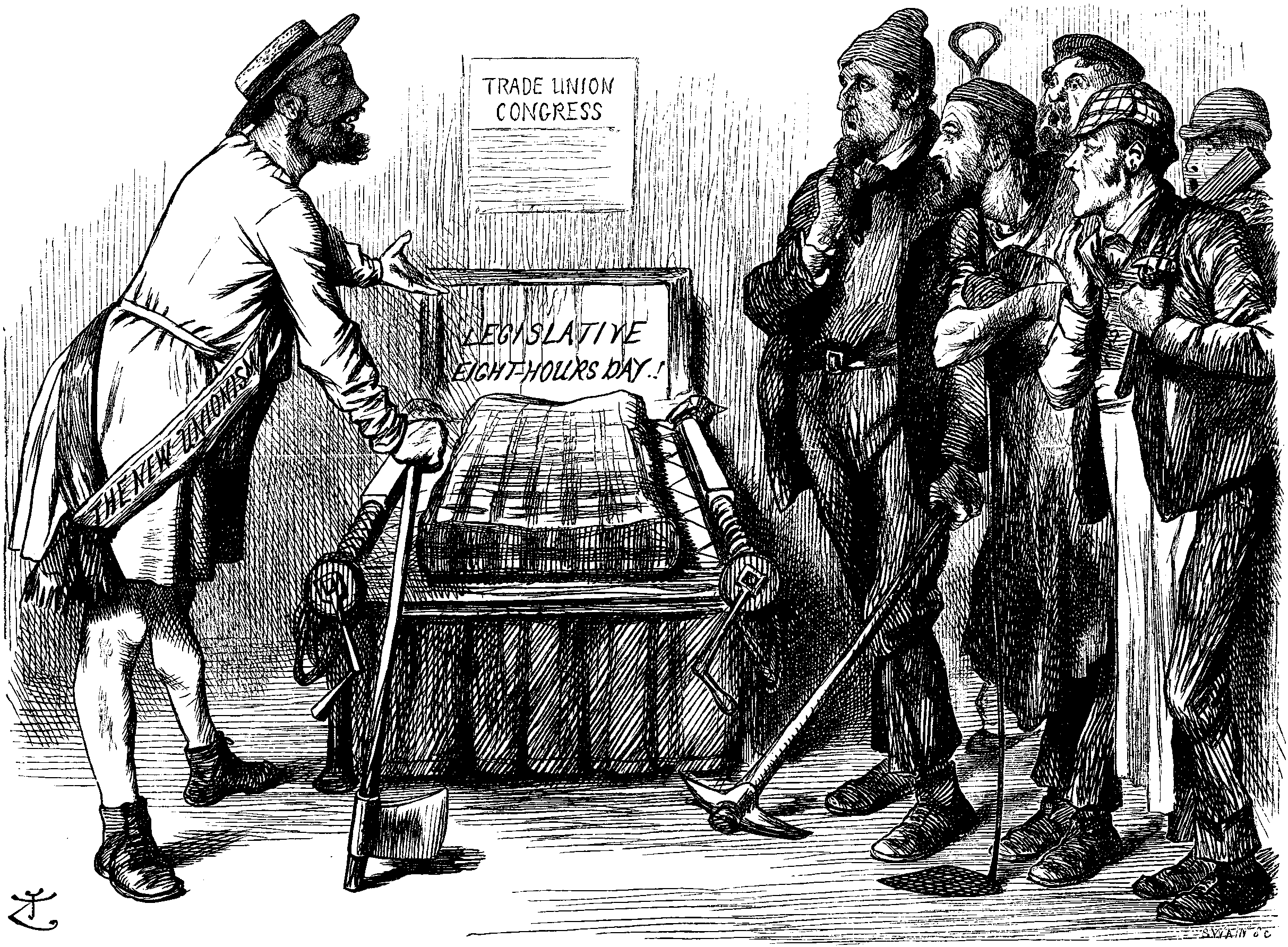
"The Modern 'Bed of Procrustes.' 'It is impossible to establish universal uniformity of hours without inflicting very serious injury to workers.' — Motion at the recent Trades' Congress." Cartoon from Punch, 1891.

A Procrustean bed is an arbitrary standard to which exact conformity is forced.

- In Edgar Allan Poe's influential crime story "The Purloined Letter" (1844), the private detective Dupin uses the metaphor of a Procrustean bed to describe the Parisian police's overly rigid method of looking for clues.
- French philosopher Jacques Derrida, in "The Purveyor of Truth", his response to Jacques Lacan's seminar on "The Purloined Letter" (1956), applies the metaphor to the structural analysis of texts: "By framing in this violent way, by cutting the narrated figure itself from a fourth side in order to see only triangles, one evades perhaps a certain complication." This is one of deconstruction's central critiques of structural (and formal) literary analysis. Slavoj Žižek draws upon the metaphor to critique poetic form: "The most elementary form of torturing one's language is called poetry—think of what a complex form like a sonnet does to language: it forces the free flow of speech into a Procrustean bed of fixed forms of rhythm and rhyme." Poet Hollis Robbins draws upon the metaphor to structure a sonnet about cutting lines to fit meter and rhyme.
- Thomas Jefferson used the Procrustean bed as a metaphor in a paper on religious freedom. "Reason and experiment have been indulged, and error has fled before them. It is error alone which needs the support of government. Truth can stand by itself. Subject opinion to coercion: whom will you make your inquisitor? Fallible men; men governed by bad passions, by private as well as public reasons. And why subjected to coercion? To produce uniformity. But is uniformativity desirable? Introduce the bed of Procrustus then, and as there is danger that the large men may beat the small, make us all of a size, by lopping the former and stretching the latter. Difference of opinion is advantageous in religion."
- The Talmud uses this concept to understand the sins of the people of Sodom. Sanhedrin 109b 5 says: "The Gemara continues to discuss the sins of the people of Sodom: They had beds on which they would lay their guests; when a guest was longer than the bed they would cut him, and when a guest was shorter than the bed they would stretch him."
- The concept of the Procrustean bed has been invoked by Eurosceptics to describe the relationship between the Eurozone and its member states.
- Theodosius Dobzhansky, a founding figure in evolutionary biology and genetics, wrote "Progress of scientific understanding is often obstructed and side-tracked when a working hypothesis which proves serviceable in a certain field is used as a Procrustean bed to mutilate the evidence derived from other fields." Dobzhansky made this chiding statement in response to claims that certain biological phenomena could only arise via one mechanism.
- The Austrian-American writer Erik von Kuehnelt-Leddihn's 1943 book The Menace of the Herd, or Procrustes at Large is a critique of what the author describes as the negative effects of egalitarianism as a political philosophy, where state power is used to force individuals to fit the standards designed by politicians and intellectuals.
- In his poem Damastes z przydomkiem Prokustes mówi (Damastes (Also Known as Procrustes) Speaks), Polish poet Zbigniew Herbert shows an analogy between 'fitting' people to the bed of Procrustes and totalitarian regimes of 20th century trying to create a 'new man' that will be subordinate to their authority.
- The Bed of Procrustes: Philosophical and Practical Aphorisms is a 2010 book by philosopher and probability theorist Nassim Nicholas Taleb, author of The Black Swan and Antifragile. Giving continuation to this idea, in Antifragile, the author uses the image of the Procrustean bed as an allegory to modernity, linking it to present-day man's fear of randomness.
- Procrustes analysis is the process of performing a shape-preserving Euclidean transformation to a set of shapes. This removes variations in translation, rotation and scaling across the dataset in order to move them into a common frame of reference. This is generally the precursor to further statistical analysis. A related problem in linear algebra is the orthogonal Procrustes problem of finding the closest orthogonal matrix to any given matrix.
- A Procrustean solution is the undesirable practice of tailoring data to fit its container or some other preconceived structure. In a Procrustean solution in statistics, instead of finding the best fit line to a scatter plot of data, one first chooses the line one wants, then selects only the data that fits it, disregarding data that does not, so to "prove" some idea. It is a form of rhetorical deception made to forward one set of interests at the expense of others. The unique goal of the Procrustean solution is not win-win, but rather that Procrustes wins and the other loses. In this case, the defeat of the opponent justifies the deceptive means.
- The term "procrusticism" appears in the novel Eden by Polish science fiction writer Stanisław Lem, where it denotes the forced adaptation of the entire society of the planet to doctrinal, quasi-religious (including biological) models.
- In computer science, a Procrustean string is a fixed length string into which strings of varying lengths are placed. If the string inserted is too short, then it is padded out, usually with spaces or null characters. If the string inserted is too long, it is truncated. The concept is mentioned in the ZX81 and ZX Spectrum user manuals, where a portion of a string is replaced by another string using Procrustean assignment—the replacement string is truncated or padded in order to have length equal to the portion being replaced. Such an assignment is also sometimes referred to as Procrustean formatting. Although the term did not catch on in wider usage, it appears in some references, notably FOLDOC.
- The film editor Walter Murch refers, not entirely negatively, to a certain style of film editing as "procrustean". If the first assembly of a film is too long by a certain amount, that amount is removed quickly, sometimes brutally. Then the film is viewed at this new length, and progress afterwards is aimed at smoothing out the amputations without adding length. Similarly, Vince Gilligan alludes to the Procrustean bed when stating that each episode of Breaking Bad had to be edited to a length of exactly 47 minutes, 7 seconds, and 4 frames.
- Procrustes appears in the Percy Jackson & the Olympians book The Lightning Thief. This version is depicted as a half-giant who is a water bed salesman. He also appeared in the Disney+ fantasy show Percy Jackson and the Olympians, played by Julian Richings (who also played Charon in Percy Jackson & the Olympians: The Lighting Thief). The main difference is that the heroes decided to spare him, unlike the book.
- The legend of Procrustes figures prominently in Malayalam literature, beginning with the highly acclaimed poem titled eponymously "Procrustes" by Vayalar Ramavarma.
- Patul lui Procust (The Bed of Procrustes) is a novel by Romanian author Camil Petrescu.
- Sleepless Nights in the Procrustean Bed is a collection of essays by Harlan Ellison.
- In A. F. Th. van der Heijden's novel Het Schervengericht (Jugement by shards), Procrustes' bed is used as a symbol for the strict standards of the society.
- In Cormac McCarthy's Blood Meridian, John Joel Glanton, a filibuster and scalp collector who has taken control of the Yuma Ferry by means of violence, is described as imposing a "procrustean" toll on his clients wherein "the fares were tailored to accommodate the purses of the travelers". The meaning here denotes how Glanton and his men would not ferry any customer until they had surrendered all of their money and goods, leaving them entirely destitute.
- The Mexican stop-motion animated series Frankelda's Book of Spooks features a spidery villain named Procustes, being the nightmare kingdom's royal writer who refuses to accept the shortcomings of his work in a changing world and imprisons the soul of Frankelda, a female horror writer defying the standards and expectations placed on her in 1870s Mexico, within his slumbering mind. While peering into Frankelda's dreams to steal her stories in the film I Am Frankelda, he takes the form of a bed.

== See also ==
- Ergonomics – Designing systems to suit their users
- Generalized Procrustes analysis – Method of statistical analysis
- One size fits all
- Procrustes analysis – Statistical shape analysis technique
- Rack (torture)
- Xenia (Greek) – Ancient Greek concept of hospitality

== General and cited references ==
- Diodorus Siculus (1989). The Library of History. Loeb Classical Library. Vol. 3. Translated by Oldfather, Charles Henry (Reprint ed.). Cambridge, MA: Harvard University Press. pp. Books 4.59–8. OCLC 1303634724.
- Diodorus Siculus (1906). Diodori Bibliotheca Historica (in Ancient Greek). Vol. V. Editionem primam curavit Immanuel Bekker; alteram Ludovicus Dindorf; recognovit Curtius Theodorus Fischer. Leipzig: B. G. Teubner. pp. Books 19–20.
- Hyginus, Gaius Julius (1960). Grant, Mary (ed.). Fabulae from The Myths of Hyginus. University of Kansas Publications in Humanistic Studies. Translated by Grant, Mary. Lawrence, KS: University of Kansas. OCLC 1875535.
- Plutarch, Lucius Mestrius (1914). Lives. Loeb Classical Library. Vol. 1. Translated by Perrin, Bernadotte. Cambridge, MA: Harvard University Press.
  - Plutarch (1914). Lives. Loeb Classical Library (in Ancient Greek). Vol. 1. Cambridge, MA: Harvard University Press.
- Pausanias (1918). Description of Greece. Loeb Classical Library. Vol. 1–4. Translated by Jones, W. H. S. and Ormerod, H. A. Cambridge, MA: Harvard University Press.
- Pausanias (1903). Graeciae Descriptio (in Ancient Greek). Vol. 1–3. Leipzig: B. G. Teubner.
- Apollodorus (1921). The Library. Loeb Classical Library. Vol. 1–2. Translated by Frazer, James George. Cambridge, MA: Harvard University Press.
  - Apollodorus (1921). Bibliotheca. Loeb Classical Library (in Ancient Greek). Vol. 1–2. Cambridge, MA: Harvard University Press.
- Xenophon (1994) [371]. "1.14". In Bruell, Christopher (ed.). Memorabilia. The Agora Editions. Vol. II. Translated by Bonnette, Amy L. Ithaca, NY: Cornell University Press.
- "About maths and myths: A spanish article published in El País about the origin of some problems".
