= One size fits all =

Product that is supposed to fit in all instances

"One size fits all" is a description for a product that would fit in all instances. The term has been extended to mean one style or procedure would fit in all related applications. It is an alternative for "Not everyone fits the mold." It has been in use for over five decades. There are both positive and negative uses of the phrase.

The term "one size fits all" has been used as a common, cliché phrase for over 50 years.

== Positive views of the phrase ==
There are several positive views of the phrase "one size fits all":

- A wristwatch could be considered as fitting all people.
- In women's clothing, a flexible or open garment can be labeled as one size fits all; however, the size is typically a medium size (able to expand), rather than actually fitting petite or extra-large (XL) sizes.
- A neck chain could be designed to be worn by a person of any size.
- Bicycle helmets with ring fit systems allow for a single size, also known as universal fit.
- In military gear, some items have just one size (but smaller or larger people have already been excluded from military service).
- Many baseball hats available for commercial purchase are labeled and marketed as "one-size-fits-all. However, it is not uncommon for these to not fit persons with large or small heads, and therefore it is important to measure the head for the appropriate hat size first.

== Negative views of the phrase ==
There are many negative views of the phrase "one size fits all" including:

- Many customers prefer to have custom-tailored clothing.
- Men's suits typically have specific sizes for chest & waist measurements.
- Shoes are an example where sizes (and widths) vary depending on the specific person.
- For the U.S. G.I. Bill in education, options and coverage will vary depending on each person.

Politically, the phrase has come to mean that methods of administration or political beliefs in one country should not necessarily be applied to another.

== See also ==
- Custom tailoring
- Procrustes
- Target marketing
