= Template modeling score =

Measure of similarity between two protein structures

In bioinformatics, the template modeling score or TM-score is a measure of similarity between two protein structures. The TM-score is intended as a more accurate measure of the global similarity of full-length protein structures than the often used RMSD measure. The TM-score indicates the similarity between two structures by a score between $(0,1]$, where 1 indicates a perfect match between two structures (thus the higher the better). Generally scores below 0.20 corresponds to randomly chosen unrelated proteins whereas structures with a score higher than 0.5 assume roughly the same fold. A quantitative study shows that proteins of TM-score = 0.5 have a posterior probability of 37% in the same CATH topology family and of 13% in the same SCOP fold family. The probabilities increase rapidly when TM-score > 0.5. The TM-score is designed to be independent of protein lengths.

== The TM-score equation ==
TM-score between two protein structures (e.g., a template structure and a target structure) is defined by

$$\text{TM-score}=\max\left[ \frac{1}{L_\text{target}}\sum_i^{L_\text{common}}\frac{1}{1+\left(\frac{d_i}{d_0(L_\text{target})}\right)^2} \right]$$

where $L_\text{target}$ is the length of the amino acid sequence of the target protein, and $L_\text{common}$ is the number of residues that appear in both the template and target structures. $d_i$ is the distance between the $i$th pair of residues in the template and target structures, and $d_0(L_\text{target})=1.24\sqrt[3]{L_\text{target}-15}-1.8$ is a distance scale that normalizes distances. The maximum is taken over all possible structure superpositions of the model and template (or some sample thereof).

When comparing two protein structures that have the same residue order, $L_\text{common}$ reads from the C-alpha order number of the structure files (i.e., Column 23-26 in Protein Data Bank (file format)). When comparing two protein structures that have different sequences and/or different residue orders, a structural alignment is usually performed first, and TM-score is then calculated on the commonly aligned residues from the structural alignment.

== Other measures ==
An often used structural similarity measure is root-mean-square deviation (RMSD). Because RMSD $=\sqrt{\sum_{i=1}^{L} d_i^2/{L}}$ is calculated as an average of distance error ($d_i$) with equal weight over all residue pairs, a large local error on a few residue pairs can result in a quite large RMSD. On the other hand, by putting $d_i$ in the denominator, TM-score naturally weights smaller distance errors more strongly than larger distance errors. Therefore, TM-score value is more sensitive to the global structural similarity rather than to the local structural errors, compared to RMSD. Another advantage of TM-score is the introduction of the scale $d_0(L_\text{target})=1.24\sqrt[3]{L_\text{target}-15}-1.8$ which makes the magnitude of TM-score length-independent for random structure pairs, while RMSD and most other measures are length-dependent metrics.

The Global Distance Test (GDT) algorithm, and its GDT TS score to represent "total score", is another measure of similarity between two protein structures with known amino acid correspondences (e.g. identical amino acid sequences) but different tertiary structures. GDT score has the same length-dependence issue as RMSD, because the average GDT score for random structure pairs has a power-law dependence on the protein size.

== See also ==
- RMSD — a different structure comparison measure
- GDT — a different structure comparison measure
- Longest continuous segment (LCS) — A different structure comparison measure
- Global distance calculation (GDC_sc, GDC_all) — Structure comparison measures that use full-model information (not just α-carbon) to assess similarity
- Local global alignment (LGA) — Protein structure alignment program and structure comparison measure
