= Root mean square deviation of atomic positions =

Measure of distance between atoms of superimposed proteins

In bioinformatics, the root mean square deviation of atomic positions, or simply root mean square deviation (RMSD), is the measure of the average distance between the atoms (usually the backbone atoms) of superimposed molecules. In the study of globular protein conformations, one customarily measures the similarity in three-dimensional structure by the RMSD of the Cα atomic coordinates after optimal rigid body superposition.

When a dynamical system fluctuates about some well-defined average position, the RMSD from the average over time can be referred to as the RMSF or root mean square fluctuation. The size of this fluctuation can be measured, for example using Mössbauer spectroscopy or nuclear magnetic resonance, and can provide important physical information. The Lindemann index is a method of placing the RMSF in the context of the parameters of the system.

A widely used way to compare the structures of biomolecules or solid bodies is to translate and rotate one structure with respect to the other to minimize the RMSD. Coutsias, et al. presented a simple derivation, based on quaternions, for the optimal solid body transformation (rotation-translation) that minimizes the RMSD between two sets of vectors. They proved that the quaternion method is equivalent to the well-known Kabsch algorithm. The solution given by Kabsch is an instance of the solution of the d-dimensional problem, introduced by Hurley and Cattell. The quaternion solution to compute the optimal rotation was published in the appendix of a paper of Petitjean. This quaternion solution and the calculation of the optimal isometry in the d-dimensional case were both extended to infinite sets and to the continuous case in the appendix A of another paper of Petitjean.

== The equation ==
$$\mathrm{RMSD}=\sqrt{\frac{1}{N}\sum_{i=1}^N\delta_i^2}$$

where δ_{i} is the distance between atom i and either a reference structure or the mean position of the N equivalent atoms. This is often calculated for the backbone heavy atoms C, N, O, and C_{α} or sometimes just the C_{α} atoms.

Normally a rigid superposition which minimizes the RMSD is performed, and this minimum is returned. Given two sets of $n$ points $\mathbf{v}$ and $\mathbf{w}$, the RMSD is defined as follows:

$$\begin{align}
\mathrm{RMSD}(\mathbf{v}, \mathbf{w}) & = \sqrt{\frac{1}{n}\sum_{i=1}^n \|v_i - w_i\|^2} \\
& = \sqrt{\frac{1}{n} \sum_{i=1}^n
((v_{ix} - w_{ix})^2 + (v_{iy} - w_{iy})^2 + (v_{iz} - w_{iz})^2})
\end{align}$$

An RMSD value is expressed in length units. The most commonly used unit in structural biology is the Ångström (Å) which is equal to 10^{−10} m.

== Uses ==
Typically RMSD is used as a quantitative measure of similarity between two or more protein structures. For example, the CASP protein structure prediction competition uses RMSD as one of its assessments of how well a submitted structure matches the known target structure. Thus the lower RMSD, the better the model is in comparison to the target structure.

Also some scientists who study protein folding by computer simulations use RMSD as a reaction coordinate to quantify where the protein is between the folded state and the unfolded state.

The study of RMSD for small organic molecules (commonly called ligands when they're binding to macromolecules, such as proteins, is studied) is common in the context of docking, as well as in other methods to study the configuration of ligands when bound to macromolecules. Note that, for the case of ligands (contrary to proteins, as described above), their structures are most commonly not superimposed prior to the calculation of the RMSD.

RMSD is also one of several metrics that have been proposed for quantifying evolutionary similarity between proteins, as well as the quality of sequence alignments.

== See also ==
- Root mean square deviation
- Root mean square fluctuation
- Quaternion – used to optimise RMSD calculations
- Kabsch algorithm – an algorithm used to minimize the RMSD by first finding the best rotation
- GDT – a different structure comparison measure
- TM-score – a different structure comparison measure
- Longest continuous segment (LCS) — A different structure comparison measure
- Global distance calculation (GDC_sc, GDC_all) — Structure comparison measures that use full-model information (not just α-carbon) to assess similarity
- Local global alignment (LGA) — Protein structure alignment program and structure comparison measure
