= Global distance test =

Measure of similarity between two protein structures

The global distance test (GDT), also written as GDT_TS to represent "total score", is a measure of similarity between two protein structures with known amino acid correspondences (e.g. identical amino acid sequences) but different tertiary structures. It is most commonly used to compare the results of protein structure prediction to the experimentally determined structure as measured by X-ray crystallography, protein NMR, or, increasingly, cryoelectron microscopy.

The GDT metric was developed by Adam Zemla at Lawrence Livermore National Laboratory and originally implemented in the Local-Global Alignment (LGA) program. It is intended as a more accurate measurement than the common root-mean-square deviation (RMSD) metric - which is sensitive to outlier regions created, for example, by poor modeling of individual loop regions in a structure that is otherwise reasonably accurate. The conventional GDT_TS score is computed over the alpha carbon atoms and is reported as a percentage, ranging from 0 to 100. In general, the higher the GDT_TS score, the more closely a model approximates a given reference structure.

GDT_TS measurements are used as major assessment criteria in the production of results from the Critical Assessment of Structure Prediction (CASP), a large-scale experiment in the structure prediction community dedicated to assessing current modeling techniques. The metric was first introduced as an evaluation standard in the third iteration of the biannual experiment (CASP3) in 1998. Various extensions to the original method have been developed; variations that accounts for the positions of the side chains are known as global distance calculations (GDC).

== Calculation ==
The GDT score is calculated as the largest set of amino acid residues' alpha carbon atoms in the model structure falling within a defined distance cutoff of their position in the experimental structure, after iteratively superimposing the two structures. By the original design the GDT algorithm calculates 20 GDT scores, i.e. for each of 20 consecutive distance cutoffs (0.5 Å, 1.0 Å, 1.5 Å, ... 10.0 Å). For structure similarity assessment it is intended to use the GDT scores from several cutoff distances, and scores generally increase with increasing cutoff. A plateau in this increase may indicate an extreme divergence between the experimental and predicted structures, such that no additional atoms are included in any cutoff of a reasonable distance. The conventional GDT_TS total score in CASP is the average result of cutoffs at 1, 2, 4, and 8 Å.

== Variations and extensions ==
The original GDT_TS is calculated based on the superimpositions and GDT scores produced by the Local-Global Alignment (LGA) program. A "high accuracy" version called GDT_HA is computed by selection of smaller cutoff distances (half the size of GDT_TS) and thus more heavily penalizes larger deviations from the reference structure. It was used in the high accuracy category of CASP7. CASP8 defined a new "TR score", which is GDT_TS minus a penalty for residues clustered too close, meant to penalize steric clashes in the predicted structure, sometimes to game the cutoff measure of GDT.

The primary GDT assessment uses only the alpha carbon atoms. To apply superposition‐based scoring to the amino acid residue side chains, a GDT‐like score called "global distance calculation for sidechains" (GDC_sc) was designed and implemented within the LGA program in 2008. Instead of comparing residue positions on the basis of alpha carbons, GDC_sc uses a predefined "characteristic atom" near the end of each residue for the evaluation of inter-residue distance deviations. An "all atoms" variant of the GDC score (GDC_all) is calculated using full-model information, and is one of the standard measures used by CASP's organizers and assessors to evaluate accuracy of predicted structural models.

GDT scores are generally computed with respect to a single reference structure. In some cases, structural models with lower GDT scores to a reference structure determined by protein NMR are nevertheless better fits to the underlying experimental data. Methods have been developed to estimate the uncertainty of GDT scores due to protein flexibility and uncertainty in the reference structure.

== See also ==
- Root mean square deviation (bioinformatics) — A different structure comparison measure.
- TM-score — A different structure comparison measure.
