= Outline of brain mapping =

Overview of and topical guide to brain mapping

The following outline is provided as an overview of and topical guide to brain mapping:

Brain mapping – set of neuroscience techniques predicated on the mapping of (biological) quantities or properties onto spatial representations of the (human or non-human) brain resulting in maps. Brain mapping is further defined as the study of the anatomy and function of the brain and spinal cord through the use of imaging (including intra-operative, microscopic, endoscopic and multi-modality imaging), immunohistochemistry, molecular and optogenetics, stem cell and cellular biology, engineering (material, electrical and biomedical), neurophysiology and nanotechnology.

== Broad scope ==
- History of neuroscience
- History of neurology
- Brain mapping
- Human brain
- Neuroscience
- Nervous system

=== The neuron doctrine ===
- Neuron doctrine – A set of carefully constructed elementary set of observations regarding neurons. For more granularity, more current, and more advanced topics, see the cellular level section
- Asserts that neurons fall under the broader cell theory, which postulates:
  - All living organisms are composed of one or more cells.
  - The cell is the basic unit of structure, function, and organization in all organisms.
  - All cells come from preexisting, living cells.
- The Neuron doctrine postulates several elementary aspects of neurons:
  - The brain is made up of individual cells (neurons) that contain specialized features such as dendrites, a cell body, and an axon.
  - Neurons are cells differentiable from other tissues in the body.
  - Neurons differ in size, shape, and structure according to their location or functional specialization.
  - Every neuron has a nucleus, which is the trophic center of the cell (The part which must have access to nutrition). If the cell is divided, only the portion containing the nucleus will survive.
  - Nerve fibers are the result of cell processes and the outgrowths of nerve cells. (Several axons are bound together to form one nerve fibril. See also: Neurofilament. Several nerve fibrils then form one large nerve fiber. Myelin, an electrical insulator, forms around selected axons.
  - Neurons are generated by cell division.
  - Neurons are connected by sites of contact and not via cytoplasmic continuity. (A cell membrane isolates the inside of the cell from its environment. Neurons do not communicate via direct cytoplasm to cytoplasm contact.)
  - Law of dynamic polarization. Although the axon can conduct in both directions, in tissue there is a preferred direction of transmission from cell to cell.
- Elements added later to the initial Neuron doctrine
  - A barrier to transmission exists at the site of contact between two neurons that may permit transmission. (Synapse)
  - Unity of transmission. If a contact is made between two cells, then that contact can be either excitatory or inhibitory, but will always be of the same type.
  - Dale's law, each nerve terminal releases a single type of neurotransmitter.
- Some of the basic postulates in the Neuron doctrine have been subsequently questioned, refuted, or updated. See the cellular level section topics for additional information.

=== Map, atlas, and database projects ===
- Brain Activity Map Project – 2013 NIH $3 billion project to map every neuron in the human brain in ten years, based upon the Human Genome Project.

- NIH Brain Research through Advancing Innovative Neurotechnologies (BRAIN) Initiative
- Community outreach site for above where the public may comment

- Human Brain Project (EU) – 1 billion euro, 10-year project to simulate the human brain with supercomputers.

- BigBrain A high-resolution 3D atlas of the human brain created as part of the HBP.

- Human Connectome Project – 2009 NIH $30 million project to build a network map of the human brain, including structural (anatomical) and functional elements. Emphasis included research into dyslexia, autism, Alzheimer's disease, and schizophrenia. See also Connectome a, comprehensive map of neural connections in the brain.
- Allen Brain Atlas – 2003 $100 million project funded by Paul Allen (Microsoft)
- BrainMaps – National Institute of Health (NIH) database including 60 terabytes of image scans of primate and non-primates, integrated with information covering structure and function.
- NeuroNames – Defines the brain in terms of about 550 primary structures (about 850 unique structures) to which all other structures, names, and synonyms are related. About 15,000 neuroanatomical terms are cross indexed, including many synonyms in seven languages. Coverage includes the brain and spinal cord of the four species most frequently studied by neuroscientists: human, macaque (monkey), rat and mouse. The controlled, standardized vocabulary for each structure is located in an unambiguous, strict physical hierarchy, and these terms are selected based on ease of pronunciation, mnemonic value, and frequency of use in recent neuroscientific publications. Relation of each structure to its superstructures and substructures is included. The controlled vocabulary is suitable for uniquely indexing neuroanatomical information in digital databases.
- Decade of the Brain 1990–1999 promotion by NIH and the Library of Congress "to enhance public awareness of the benefits to be derived from brain research". Communications targeted Members of Congress, staffs, and the general public to promote funding.
- Talairach Atlas see Jean Talairach
- Harvard Whole Brain Atlas see Human brain
- MNI Template see Medical image computing
- Blue Brain Project and Artificial brain
- International Consortium for Brain Mapping see Brain Mapping
- List of neuroscience databases
- NIH Toolbox National Institute of Health (USA) toolbox for the assessment of neurological and behavioral function
- Organization for Human Brain Mapping The Organization for Human Brain Mapping (OHBM) is an international society dedicated to using neuroimaging to discover the organization of the human brain.

== Imaging and recording systems ==
This section covers imaging and recording systems. The general section covers history, neuroimaging, and techniques for mapping specific neural connections. The specific systems section covers the various specific technologies, including experimental and widely deployed imaging and recording systems.

=== General ===
- Most imaging work to date on individual neurons has been conducted outside the brain, typically on large neurons, and has been most frequently destructive. New techniques are however rapidly emerging. Search on "Single neuron imaging" and see related topics: Biological neuron model, Single-unit recording, Neural oscillation, Computational neuroscience. dMRI (above) is also promising in non-destructive imaging of single neurons inside the brain.
- History of neuroimaging (redirects from Brain scanner)
- Neuroimaging (redirects from Brain function map)
- Connectomics – mapping technique showing neural connections in a nervous system.

=== Specific systems ===
- Cortical stimulation mapping
- Diffusion MRI (dMRI) – includes diffusion tensor imaging (DTI) and diffusion functional MRI (DfMRI). dMRI is a recent breakthrough in brain mapping allowing the visualization of cross connections between different anatomical parts of the brain. It allows noninvasive imaging of white matter fiber structure and in addition to mapping can be useful in clinical observations of abnormalities, including damage from stroke.
- Electroencephalography (EEG) – uses electrodes on the scalp and other techniques to detect the electrical flow of currents.
- Electrocorticography – intracranial EEG, the practice of using electrodes placed directly on the exposed surface of the brain to record electrical activity from the cerebral cortex.
- Electrophysiological techniques for clinical diagnosis
- Functional magnetic resonance imaging (fMRI)
- Medical image computing (brain research of leads medical and surgical uses of mapping technology)
- Neurostimulation (in research stimulation is frequently used in conjunction with imaging)
- Positron emission tomography (PET) – a nuclear medical imaging technique that produces a three-dimensional image or picture of functional processes in the body. The system detects pairs of gamma rays emitted indirectly by a positron-emitting radionuclide (tracer), which is introduced into the body on a biologically active molecule. Three-dimensional images of tracer concentration within the body are then constructed by computer analysis. In modern scanners, three dimensional imaging is often accomplished with the aid of a CT X-ray scan performed on the patient during the same session, in the same machine.

=== Imaging and recording componentry ===
==== Electrochemical ====
- Haemodynamic response – the rapid delivery of blood to active neuronal tissues. Blood Oxygenation Level Dependent signal (BOLD), corresponds to the concentration of deoxyhemoglobin. The BOLD effect is based on the fact that when neuronal activity is increased in one part of the brain, there is also an increased amount of cerebral blood flow to that area. Functional magnetic resonance imaging is enabled by the detection of the BOLD signal.
- Event-related functional magnetic resonance imaging can be used to detect changes in the Blood Oxygen Level Dependent (BOLD) hemodynamic response to neural activity in response to certain events.

==== Electrical ====
- Event-related potential – positive and negative 10μ to 100μ Volts (μ is millionths) responses, measured via noninvasive electrodes attached to the scalp, that are the reliable and repeatable results of a certain specific sensory, cognitive, or motor event. These are also called a stereotyped electrophysiological response to a stimulus. They are called somatosensory evoked potentials when they are elicited by sensory (vs. cognitive or motor) event stimuli. The voltage swing sequences are recorded and broken down by positive and negative, and by how long after the stimulus they are observed. For example, [N100] is a negative swing observed between 80 and 120 milliseconds (100 being the midpoint) after the onset of the stimulus. Alternatively, the voltage swings are labeled based on their order, N1 being the first negative swing observed, N2 the second negative swing, etc. See: N100 (neuroscience), N200 (neuroscience), P300 (neuroscience), N400 (neuroscience), P600 (neuroscience). The first negative and positive swings (see Visual N1, C1 and P1 (neuroscience)) in response to visual stimulation are of particular interest in studying sensitivity and selectiveness of attention.

==== Electromagnetic ====
- Magnetoencephalography – a technique for mapping brain activity by recording magnetic fields produced by electrical currents occurring naturally in the brain, using very sensitive magnetometers In research, MEG's primary use is the measurement of time courses of activity. MEG can resolve events with a precision of 10 milliseconds or faster, while functional MRI (fMRI), which depends on changes in blood flow, can at best resolve events with a precision of several hundred milliseconds. MEG also accurately pinpoints sources in primary auditory, somatosensory and motor areas. For creating functional maps of human cortex during more complex cognitive tasks, MEG is most often combined with fMRI, as the methods complement each other. Neuronal (MEG) and hemodynamic (fMRI) data do not necessarily agree, in spite of the tight relationship between local field potentials (LFP) and blood oxygenation level dependent (BOLD) signals

==== Radiological ====
- Positron-emitting radionuclide (tracer). See Positron emission tomography
- Altanserin – a compound that binds to a serotonin receptor. When labeled with the isotope fluorine-18 it is used as a radioligand in positron emission tomography (PET) studies of the brain.

==== Visual processing and image enhancement ====
- Scientific visualization – an interdisciplinary branch of science primarily concerned with the visualization of three-dimensional phenomena (including medical, biological, and others), where the emphasis is on realistic renderings of volumes, surfaces, illumination sources, and so forth, perhaps with a dynamic (time) component. It is considered a branch of computer science that is a subset of computer graphics. Brain mapping is a leading beneficiary of advances in scientific visualization.
- Blob detection – an area in computer vision, A blob is a region of a digital image in which some properties (such as brightness or color, compared to areas surrounding those regions) are constant or vary within a prescribed range of values; all the points in a blob can be considered in some sense to be similar to each other

==== Information technology ====
- Determining the number of clusters in a data set – a typical application is in data reduction: as the increase in temporal resolution of fMRI experiments routinely yields fMRI sequences containing several hundreds of images, it is sometimes necessary to invoke feature extraction to reduce the dimensionality of the data space.
- Fractional anisotropy – a measure often used in diffusion imaging where it is thought to reflect fiber density, axonal diameter, and myelination in white matter. The FA is an extension of the concept of eccentricity of conic sections in three dimensions, normalized to the unit range. Anisotropy is the property of being directionally dependent, as opposed to isotropy, which implies identical properties in all directions.
- General linear model – a statistical linear model. It may be written as Y=XB +U where Y is a matrix with series of multivariate measurements, X is a matrix that might be a design matrix, B is a matrix containing parameters that are usually to be estimated, and U is a matrix containing errors or noise. It is frequently used in the analysis of multiple brain scans in scientific experiments where Y contains data from brain scanners, X contains experimental design variables and confounds. See also: statistical parametric mapping
- Resampling (statistics) see section on permutation tests. Nonparametric Permutation Tests are used in fMRI.

==== Software packages ====
- Analysis of Functional NeuroImages – an open-source environment for processing and displaying functional MRI data
- Cambridge Brain Analysis – a software repository developed at University of Cambridge for functional magnetic resonance imaging (fMRI) analysis under the GNU General Public License and runs under Linux.
- Statistical parametric mapping – a statistical technique for examining differences in brain activity recorded during functional neuroimaging experiments using neuroimaging technologies such as fMRI or PET. It may also refer to a specific piece of software created by the Wellcome Department of Imaging Neuroscience (part of University College London) to carry out such analyses.
- ITK-SNAP an interactive software application that allows users to navigate three-dimensional medical images, manually delineate anatomical regions of interest, and perform automatic image segmentation. Its most frequently used to work with magnetic resonance imaging (MRI) and computed tomography (CT) data sets.
- Computational anatomy toolbox a software package used for the analysis of structural brain imaging data
- The Budapest Reference Connectome server generates consensus braingraphs with selectable parameters; the graphs can be downloaded in annotated GraphML format, and can also be viewed instantly on the site.

== Scientists, academics and researchers ==
- Mark S. Cohen neuroscientist Professor at the UCLA. Early pioneer of functional brain imaging using magnetic resonance imaging (MRI).
- Anders Dale neuroscientist and Professor University of California, San Diego. He developed FreeSurfer brain imaging analysis software that facilitates the visualization of the functional regions of the highly folded cerebral cortex.
- Pierre Flor-Henry demonstrated in a study of epileptic psychosis, that schizophrenia relates to left and manic-depressive states relate to right hemisphere epilepsies
- Angela D. Friederici director at the Max Planck Institute for Human Cognitive and Brain Sciences in Leipzig, Germany with a specialization in neuropsychology and linguistics.
- Karl J. Friston British neuroscientist and authority on brain imaging. Inventor of statistical parametric mapping
- Isabel Gauthier neuroscientist and head of the Object Perception Lab at Vanderbilt University
- Matthew Howard, III Professor of Neurosurgery at the University of Iowa known for contributions in the field of human brain mapping using intracranial electrophysiology.
- Dr. Surbhi Jain, the first female neurosurgeon from State of Rajasthan. Practices at the Moffitt Cancer Center, Tampa, Florida, and holds world's record for the most number of patients treated by brain mapping guided brain surgery.
- Gitte Moos Knudsen Gitte Moos Knudsen neurobiologist and clinical neurologist professor at Copenhagen University Hospital.
- Kenneth Kwong Scientist at Harvard University known for his work in fMRI
- Robert Livingston (scientist) (October 9, 1918 – April 26, 2002) neuroscientist in 1964 Livingston founded the neuroscience department, the first of its kind in the world, at the newly built University of California, San Diego. His best known research was in the computer mapping and imaging of the human brain. His interest in the brain also extended to questions of cognition, consciousness, emotions, and spirituality.
- Helen S. Mayberg – professor of neurology and psychiatry at Emory University. Specialization includes delineating abnormal brain function in patients with major depression using functional neuroimaging.
- Geraint Rees head of the University College London Faculty of Brain Sciences
- Sidarta Ribeiro neuroscientist and Director of the Brain Institute at Universidade Federal do Rio Grande do Norte
- Perminder Sachdev Neuropsychiatrist Professor at University of New South Wales and director of the Centre for Healthy Brain Ageing
- Pedro Antonio Valdes-Sosa Vice-director of the Cuban Neuroscience Center which he cofounded in 1990. His specialization includes the statistical analysis of electrophysiological measurements, neuroimaging (fMRI, EEG and MEG tomography), nonlinear dynamical modeling of brain functions including software and electrophysiological equipment development. Member of the Editorial Boards of NeuroImage, Medicc, Audioology and Neurotology, PLosOne, and Brain Connectivity.
- Robert Turner director at the Max Planck Institute for Human Cognitive and Brain Sciences in Leipzig, Germany with a specialization in brain physics and magnetic resonance imaging (MRI). He is credited with creating the design for the coils found inside every MRI scanner.
- Arno Villringer Director at the Max Planck Institute for Human Cognitive and Brain Sciences in Leipzig, Germany

== Journals ==
- Behavioral and Brain Sciences
- Developmental Science
- Genes, Brain and Behavior
- Human Brain Mapping (journal)
- Journal of Cerebral Blood Flow & Metabolism
- Journal of Neurochemistry
- Journal of Neurophysiology
- Journal of Neuroscience
- Nature Neuroscience
- NeuroImage
- Neuron
- Trends in Neurosciences

== See also ==
- Outline of the human brain
- Outline of neuroscience
