= List of functional connectivity software =

Functional connectivity software is used to study functional properties of the connectome using functional Magnetic Resonance Imaging (fMRI) data in the resting state and during tasks. To access many of these software applications visit the NIH funded Neuroimaging Informatics Tools and Resources Clearinghouse (NITRC) site.

Name	Description	Programming language	Is part of / requires	Developer/Organization
CONN	Functional connectivity analysis and display tool	Matlab	SPM	McGovern Institute for Brain Research, Massachusetts Institute of Technology: MIT
DCM	Dynamic Causal Modelling analysis	Matlab	SPM	Wellcome Trust Centre for Neuroimaging, University College London
FATCAT	Functional and tractographic connectivity analysis	C	AFNI	Scientific and Statistical Computing Core, National Institute of Mental Health: NIMH
FSFC	Seed-based functional connectivity analysis	Shell	FreeSurfer	Martinos Center for Biomedical Imaging
MELODIC	Independent component analysis	C	FSL	Functional Magnetic Resonance Imaging of the Brain Analysis Group, Oxford University

== See also ==
- List of neuroimaging software
- Functional connectivity
- Neuroimaging
