= List of neuroimaging software =

Neuroimaging software is used to study the structure and function of the brain. To see an NIH Blueprint for Neuroscience Research funded clearinghouse of many of these software applications, as well as hardware, etc. go to the NITRC web site.

- 3D Slicer – extensible, free open source multi-purpose software for visualization and analysis
- Amira 3D visualization and analysis software
- Analysis of Functional NeuroImages (AFNI)
- Analyze – developed by the Biomedical Imaging Resource (BIR) at Mayo Clinic
- Brain Image Analysis Package
- CamBA
- Caret – Van Essen Lab, Washington University in St. Louis
- Computational anatomy toolbox (CAT)
- CONN (functional connectivity toolbox)
- Diffusion Imaging in Python (DIPY)
- DL+DiReCT
- EEGLAB
- FMRIB Software Library (FSL)
- FreeSurfer
- Imaris Imaris for Neuroscientists
- ISAS (Ictal-Interictal SPECT Analysis by SPM)
- LONI Pipeline – Laboratory of Neuro Imaging, USC
- Lead-DBS
- Mango
- NITRC – The Neuroimaging Informatics Tools and Resources Clearinghouse. An NIH-funded database of neuroimaging tools.
- NeuroKit – a Python open source toolbox for physiological signal processing
- Neurophysiological Biomarker Toolbox
- PyNets: A Reproducible Workflow for Structural and Functional Connectome Ensemble Learning (PyNets)
- Seed-based d mapping (previously signed differential mapping; SDM) – a method for conducting meta-analyses of voxel-based neuroimaging studies
- The Spinal Cord Toolbox (SCT) is the first comprehensive and open-source software for processing MR images of the spinal cord.
- Statistical parametric mapping (SPM)
