= Cambridge Brain Analysis =

Repository of fMRI analysis software

Cambridge Brain Analysis (CamBA), is a software repository developed at the Brain Mapping Unit, Department of Psychiatry, University of Cambridge, UK and contains software pipelines for functional magnetic resonance imaging (fMRI) analysis. It is designed for batch processing and its main graphical user interface offers a spreadsheet-like look-and-feel.

The software is available under the GNU General Public License and runs under Linux. Up-to-date information is available at the Neuroimaging Informatics Tools and Resources Clearinghouse.

== History ==
The origins of the CamBA software repository begin in 1996 at the Institute of Psychiatry, King's College London, London, UK. Professor Edward Bullmore and Professor Mick Brammer wrote a small package of software components to process functional magnetic resonance imaging data, which at that time was an emerging technology. In 1999 Dr John Suckling became involved in the first effort to coordinate and organise the software including options for processing structural MRI images and between-subject statistical inference, based on randomisation methods.

The CamBA initiative began in 2006. Instead of a library of functions, CamBA is better described as a software repository. It is an Eclipse RCP-based application and contains a number of pipelines which are constructed from software modules contributed by a variety of authors using a common ontology.

== See also ==
- functional magnetic resonance imaging
- functional neuroimaging
- neuroimaging
- AFNI
- FreeSurfer
- FSL
- SPM
