= CONN (functional connectivity toolbox) =

- CONN (functional connectivity toolbox)
- Developer(s): The Gabrieli Lab. McGovern Institute for Brain Research. MIT
- Stable release: 2021
- Operating system: Microsoft Windows Linux Mac OS X
- Type: Neuroimaging data analysis
- License: MIT License
- Website: www.nitrc.org/projects/conn - NITRC www.conn-toolbox.org - CONN

CONN is a Matlab-based cross-platform imaging software for the computation, display, and analysis of functional connectivity in fMRI (functional Magnetic Resonance Imaging) in the resting state and during task.

CONN is available as an SPM toolbox, as well as precompiled binaries for MacOS/Windows/Linux environments, and it is freely available for non-commercial use.

== Functionality ==
CONN includes a user-friendly GUI to manage all aspects of functional connectivity analyses, including preprocessing of functional and anatomical volumes, elimination of subject-movement and physiological noise, outlier scrubbing, estimation of multiple connectivity and network measures, and population-level hypothesis testing. In addition the processing pipeline can also be automated using batch scripts.

=== Preprocessing and denoising ===
CONN preprocessing pipeline includes steps designed to estimate and correct effects derived from subject motion within the scanner (realignment), correct spatial distortions due to inhomogeneities in the magnetic field (susceptibility distortion correction), correct for temporal misalignment across slices (slice timing correction), identify potential outlier images within each scanning session (outlier identification), classify different tissue types from each subject's anatomy (segmentation), or align functional and anatomical data across different subjects (functional or anatomical normalization). In addition, the BOLD signal at white matter and ventricles can be used to characterize potential motion and physiological noise sources, and the combined effect of these and other noise sources can be removed from the functional data to improve the robustness of functional connectivity measures.

=== Functional connectivity estimation ===
CONN computes multiple measures of functional connectivity, including Fisher-transformed Pearson correlation coefficients between the BOLD timeseries from different regions of interest (ROIs), as well as with every voxel in the brain. It can also estimate task related modulation of functional connectivity strength within the scanner using weighted General Linear Model as well as generalized Psychophysiological Interaction models. In addition to properties of individual connections, properties of larger connectivity networks can also be analyzed using Graph theoretical measures, Independent Component Analyses, and other network-level measures.

=== Group analyses ===
CONN supports statistical inferences of functional connectivity properties of a population from the observed properties of individual subjects in a smaller sample using a multivariate General Linear Model framework and Likelihood-ratio test statistics. Analyses that combine functional connectivity measures from multiple ROIs or voxels also incorporate additional multiple comparison corrections such as False Discovery Rate, parametric methods based on the theory of continuous random fields, and non-parametric cluster-level statistics.

== History ==
CONN is written by Alfonso Nieto-Castanon. It has been supported by the Gabrieli Lab and Ev Lab at MIT, Guenther Lab at Boston University, and PEN Lab at Northeastern University. The first release of CONN was in 2011 and there has been approximately one major new release each year to date.

== Impact ==
Since its release CONN has been downloaded over 100,000 times, and it has been cited in over 3,500 publications. It is included in the NIH funded Neuroimaging Informatics Tools and Resources Clearinghouse (NITRC) list of top-10 tools and resources in neuroimaging, and the NITRC forum has indexed to date over 10,000 posts of software support from CONN's developers and community.

== See also ==
- Statistical parametric mapping (SPM)
- Functional connectivity
- List of functional connectivity software
- Neuroimaging
- List of neuroimaging software
