= Brain mapping =

Set of neuroscience techniques

- MeSH: D001931

Brain mapping is a set of neuroscience techniques predicated on the mapping of (biological) quantities or properties onto spatial representations of the (human or non-human) brain resulting in maps.

According to the definition established in 2013 by Society for Brain Mapping and Therapeutics (SBMT), brain mapping is specifically defined, in summary, as the study of the anatomy and function of the brain and spinal cord through the use of imaging, immunohistochemistry, molecular & optogenetics, stem cell and cellular biology, engineering, neurophysiology and nanotechnology.

In 2024, a team of 287 researchers completed a full brain mapping of an adult animal (a Drosophila melanogaster, or fruit fly) and published their results in Nature.

== Overview ==
All neuroimaging is considered part of brain mapping. Brain mapping can be conceived as a higher form of neuroimaging, producing brain images supplemented by the result of additional (imaging or non-imaging) data processing or analysis, such as maps projecting (measures of) behavior onto brain regions (see fMRI). One such map, called a connectogram, depicts cortical regions around a circle, organized by lobes. Concentric circles within the ring represent various common neurological measurements, such as cortical thickness or curvature. In the center of the circles, lines representing white matter fibers illustrate the connections between cortical regions, weighted by fractional anisotropy and strength of connection. At higher resolutions brain maps are called connectomes. These maps incorporate individual neural connections in the brain and are often presented as wiring diagrams.

Brain mapping techniques are constantly evolving, and rely on the development and refinement of image acquisition, representation, analysis, visualization and interpretation techniques. Functional and structural neuroimaging are at the core of the mapping aspect of brain mapping.

Some scientists have criticized the brain image-based claims made in scientific journals and the popular press, like the discovery of "the part of the brain responsible" things like love or musical abilities or a specific memory. Many mapping techniques have a relatively low resolution, including hundreds of thousands of neurons in a single voxel. Many functions also involve multiple parts of the brain, meaning that this type of claim is probably both unverifiable with the equipment used, and generally based on an incorrect assumption about how brain functions are divided. It may be that most brain functions will only be described correctly after being measured with much more fine-grained measurements that look not at large regions but instead at a very large number of tiny individual brain circuits. Many of these studies also have technical problems like small sample size or poor equipment calibration which means they cannot be reproduced - considerations which are sometimes ignored to produce a sensational journal article or news headline. In some cases the brain mapping techniques are used for commercial purposes, lie detection, or medical diagnosis in ways which have not been scientifically validated.

== History ==
In the late 1980s in the United States, the Institute of Medicine of the National Academy of Science was commissioned to establish a panel to investigate the value of integrating neuroscientific information across a variety of techniques.

Of specific interest is using structural and functional magnetic resonance imaging (fMRI), diffusion MRI (dMRI), magnetoencephalography (MEG), electroencephalography (EEG), positron emission tomography (PET), Near-infrared spectroscopy (NIRS) and other non-invasive scanning techniques to map anatomy, physiology, perfusion, function and phenotypes of the human brain. Both healthy and diseased brains may be mapped to study memory, learning, aging, and drug effects in various populations such as people with schizophrenia, autism, and clinical depression. This led to the establishment of the Human Brain Project. It may also be crucial to understanding traumatic brain injuries (as in the case of Phineas Gage) and improving brain injury treatment.

Following a series of meetings, the International Consortium for Brain Mapping (ICBM) evolved. The ultimate goal is to develop flexible computational brain atlases.

=== Achievements ===
The Eyewire Museum is an interactive digital catalog visualizing data of mouse retinal cells.

The interactive and citizen science website Eyewire maps mices' retinal cells and was launched in 2012. In 2021, the most comprehensive 3D map of the human brain was published by researchers at Google. It shows neurons and their connections along with blood vessels and other components of a millionth of a brain. For the map, the 1 mm^{3} sized fragment was sliced into about 5,300 pieces of about 30 nanometer thickness which were then each scanned with an electron microscope. The interactive map required 1.4 petabytes of storage-space. About two months later, scientists reported that they created the first complete neuron-level-resolution 3D map of a monkey brain which they scanned via a new method within 100 hours. They made only a fraction of the 3D map publicly available as the entire map takes more than 1 petabyte of storage space even when compressed.

In October 2021, the BRAIN Initiative Cell Census Network concluded the first phase of a long-term project to generate an atlas of the entire mouse (mammalian) brain with 17 studies, including an atlas and census of cell types in the primary motor cortex.

In 2024, FlyWire, a team of 287 researchers spanning 76 institutions completed a brain mapping, or connectome, of an adult animal (a Drosophila melanogaster, or fruit fly) and published their results in Nature. Prior to this, the only adult animal to have its brain entirely reconstructed was the nematode Caenorhabditis elegans, but the fruit fly brain map is the first "complete map of any complex brain", according to Murthy, one of the researchers involved. Primary mapping data was collected through electron microscopy, assisted by artificial intelligence and citizen scientists, who corrected errors that artificial intelligence made. The resulting model had more than 140,000 neurons with over 50 million synapses. From the model, research expect to identify how the brain creates new connections for functions such as vision, creating digital twin equivalents to track how segments of the neuron connection map interact to external signals, including the nervous system.

==== Brain development ====
In 2021, the first connectome that shows how an animal's brain changes throughout its lifetime was reported. Scientists mapped and compared the whole brains of eight isogenic C. elegans worms, each at a different stage of development. Later that year, scientists combined electron microscopy and brainbow imaging to show for the first time the development of a mammalian neural circuit. They reported the complete wiring diagrams between the CNS and muscles of ten individual mice.

==== Vision ====
In August 2021, scientists of the MICrONS program, launched in 2016, published a functional connectomics dataset that "contains calcium imaging of an estimated 75,000 neurons from primary visual cortex (VISp) and three higher visual areas (VISrl, VISal and VISlm), that were recorded while a mouse viewed natural movies and parametric stimuli". Based on this data they also published "interactive visualizations of anatomical and functional data that span all 6 layers of mouse primary visual cortex and 3 higher visual areas (LM, AL, RL) within a cubic millimeter volume" – the MICrONS Explorer.

==== Brain regeneration ====
In 2022, a first spatiotemporal cellular atlas of the axolotl brain development and regeneration, the interactive Axolotl Regenerative Telencephalon Interpretation via Spatiotemporal Transcriptomic Atlas , revealed key insights about axolotl brain regeneration.

== Current atlas tools ==
- Talairach Atlas, 1988
- Harvard Whole Brain Atlas, 1995
- MNI Template, 1998 (the standard template of SPM and International Consortium for Brain Mapping)
- Atlas of the Developing Human Brain, 2012
- Infant Brain Atlas, 2023

== See also ==
- Outline of brain mapping
- Outline of the human brain
- Brain Mapping Foundation
- BrainMaps Project
- Center for Computational Biology
- Connectogram
- FreeSurfer
- Human Connectome Project
- IEEE P1906.1
- List of neuroscience databases
- Brain atlas
- Map projection
- Neuroimaging software
- Whole brain emulation
- Topographic map (neuroanatomy)
- Society for Brain Mapping and Therapeutics
- Computational anatomy
