= Christian Gaser =

German neuroscientist

- Born: Jena, Germany
- Education: Chemnitz University of Technology
- Known for: computational anatomy toolbox, voxel-based morphometry, BrainAGE
- Scientific career
- Fields: Neuroimaging, Computational neuroscience
- Workplaces: University of Jena, Harvard Medical School

Christian Gaser is a German computational neuroscientist and Professor of Computational Neuroscience and Neuroimaging at the University of Jena. He is known for developing the computational anatomy toolbox (CAT12), a software package for structural MRI analysis within the SPM framework.

== Career and research ==
Gaser received his PhD in neuroscience from the University of Magdeburg. He subsequently held post-doctoral and visiting fellowships at Harvard Medical School (Boston), UCLA (Los Angeles), Icahn School of Medicine at Mount Sinai (New York), the Australian National University (Canberra), the University of Auckland, and the University of Oxford.

His research focuses on computational neuroanatomy, neuroplasticity, aging, and imaging biomarkers for neurological and psychiatric disorders. Gaser introduced the BrainAGE framework for estimating biological brain age from MRI using machine-learning methods. His group also develops methods for cortical surface analysis, gyrification metrics, and longitudinal modeling of structural brain plasticity.

== Selected honors and awards ==
- Listed in Stanford's 'World's Top 2% Scientists' (2017-2025): Awarded by Stanford University / Elsevier to the top 2% of researchers worldwide.
- Recipient of the Hood Fellowship

== Selected publications ==
- Gaser C, Schlaug G (2003). "Brain structures differ between musicians and non-musicians". Journal of Neuroscience. 23 (27): 9240–9245. doi:10.1523/JNEUROSCI.23-27-09240.2003. PMC 6740845. PMID 14534258.
- Draganski B, Gaser C, Busch V, Schuierer G, Bogdahn U, May A (2004). "Neuroplasticity: changes in grey matter induced by training". Nature. 427 (6972): 311–312. Bibcode:2004Natur.427..311D. doi:10.1038/427311a. PMID 14737157.
- Gaser C, Nenadic I, Buchsbaum BR, Hazlett EA, Buchsbaum MS (2004). "Ventricular enlargement in schizophrenia related to volume reduction of the thalamus, striatum, and superior temporal cortex". American Journal of Psychiatry. 161 (1): 154–156. doi:10.1176/appi.ajp.161.1.154. PMID 14702264.
- Koutsouleris N, Meisenzahl EM, Davatzikos C, Bottlender R, Frodl T, Scheuerecker J, Schmitt G, Zetzsche T, Decker P, Reiser M, Möller HJ, Gaser C (2009). "Use of neuroanatomical pattern classification to identify subjects in at-risk mental states of psychosis and predict disease transition". Archives of General Psychiatry. 66 (7): 700–712. doi:10.1001/archgenpsychiatry.2009.62. PMC 4135464. PMID 19581561.
- Garo-Pascual M, Gaser C, Zhang L, Tohka J, Medina M, Strange BA (2023). "Brain structure and phenotypic profile of superagers compared with age-matched older adults: a longitudinal analysis from the Vallecas Project". Lancet Healthy Longevity. 4 (8): e374–e385. doi:10.1016/S2666-7568(23)00079-X. PMC 10397152. PMID 37454673.
- Heller C, Güllmar D, Colic L, Pritschet L, Gell M, Javaheripour N, de la Cruz F, Rojczyk P, Koeppel CJ, Larsen B, Ganjgahi H, Lange FJ, Buck AC, Jesgarzewsky TL, Dahnke R, Kiehntopf M, Jacobs EG, Kikinis Z, Walter M, Croy I, Gaser C (2025-09-26). "Hormonal milieu influences whole-brain structural dynamics across the menstrual cycle using dense sampling in multiple individuals". Nature Neuroscience. 28 (12): 2588–2600. doi:10.1038/s41593-025-02066-2. PMC 12672370. PMID 41006668.
