= Caret (software) =

Neuroimaging software

Image of CARET main window with functional and foci data on surface

CARET (Computerized Anatomical Reconstruction Toolkit) is a software application for the structural and functional analysis of the cerebral and cerebellar cortex. CARET is developed in the Van Essen Laboratory in the Department of Anatomy and Neurobiology at the Washington University School of Medicine in St. Louis, Missouri.

CARET is a free, open-source application distributed in both binary and source formats under the GNU General Public License. CARET runs on FreeBSD, Linux, Mac OS X, and Microsoft Windows.

CARET is no longer under active development and has been superseded by the Connectome Workbench software.

== CARET's capabilities ==
- Analysis of group anatomical differences using sulcal depth morphometry.
- Display of activation foci.
- Generation of flat, inflated, spherical surfaces.
- Mapping of fMRI volumes onto surfaces.
- Surface reconstruction from anatomical MRI volumes using the SureFit algorithm.
- Surface reconstruction from contours.
- Surface-based registration.
- Visualization of contours, surfaces, and volumes.

== Related Software ==
SuMS Database and WebCaret provided on-line storage of surface and volume-based data along with web-based visualization of the data.

== See also ==
- AFNI
- FMRIB Software Library
- FreeSurfer
- Computational anatomy toolbox
- Neuroimaging
- Neuroinformatics
