= Automated Anatomical Labeling =

Automated Anatomical Labeling (AAL) (or Anatomical Automatic Labeling) is a software package and digital atlas of the human brain. It is typically used in functional neuroimaging-based research to obtain neuroanatomical labels for the locations in 3-dimensional space where the measurements of some aspect of brain function were captured. In other words, it projects the divisions in the brain atlas onto brain-shaped volumes of functional data.

It is developed by a French research group based in Caen and described further in the following scientific article:

- N. Tzourio-Mazoyer; B. Landeau; D. Papathanassiou; F. Crivello; O. Etard; N. Delcroix; Bernard Mazoyer & M. Joliot (January 2002). "Automated Anatomical Labeling of activations in SPM using a Macroscopic Anatomical Parcellation of the MNI MRI single-subject brain". NeuroImage. 15 (1): 273–289. doi:10.1006/nimg.2001.0978. hdl:1773/44951. PMID 11771995.

The AAL program is dependent upon the Matlab and SPM programs, but the digital human brain atlas itself can also be found elsewhere—within the MRIcron program, for example.
