= Reinhard Heun =

German psychiatrist and academic

- Born: Germany
- Citizenship: German
- Occupations: Psychiatrist and an academic

Academic background
- Education: Baccalaureate; Diploma in Biology (Biochemistry); Medical Doctorate; Ph.D. in Psychiatry and Psychotherapy; Diploma in Management for Physicians; B.Sc. in Mathematics

Academic work
- Institutions: University of Bonn

Reinhard Heun is a German psychiatrist and an academic. He is an associate professor of psychiatry and psychotherapy at the University of Bonn.

Heun is known for his works on functional neuroimaging, genetic and epidemiological studies, and clinical trials for mental disorders, particularly dementia, depression, schizophrenia, and anxiety. He has received funding for his research from various institutions, including the German Research Foundation, and is a recipient of multiple Clinical Excellence Awards from the NHS Trust.

He is the editor-in-chief of Global Psychiatry Archives.

== Education ==
Heun completed his Baccalaureate at Corvinianum Northeim in 1976, followed by a Diploma in Biology (Biochemistry) from the University of Göttingen in 1982. He obtained his Medical Doctorate from the University of Würzburg in 1985. In 1996, he completed his Habilitation in Psychiatry from the University of Mainz, followed by a Ph.D. in Psychiatry and Psychotherapy from the University of Bonn in 1999. In 2003, he received a Diploma in Management for Physicians from the University of Chur. Most recently, in 2023, he completed a B.Sc. in Mathematics from the Open University in the UK.

== Career ==
From 2003 to 2010, he was an Honorary Senior Clinical Lecturer in the School of Neurology, Neurobiology, and Psychiatry at the University of Newcastle. Concurrently, he served as an Honorary Reader in the Department of Psychology at the University of Durham from 2003 to 2008, and as chair and Professor of Old Age Psychiatry at the University of Birmingham from 2005 to 2008. Since 2002, he has been an associate professor of Psychiatry and Psychotherapy at the University of Bonn.

Heun has held a number of administrative and professional appointments. He began in the Department of Neurology at the University of Saarland from 1985 to 1987, and then moved to a similar role in the Department of Neurology at the University of Würzburg from 1988 to 1989. Following this, he transitioned to the Department of Psychiatry at the University of Mainz, where he worked from 1989 to 1995. Subsequently, from 1995 to 2002, he served as deputy director of the Department of Psychiatry at the University of Bonn. In 2002, he briefly held the position of head of the Department of Gerontopsychiatry and deputy director of the Centre for Social Psychiatry Bergstrasse, concluding this role in 2003. From 2003 to 2005, he continued his career in the UK as a consultant psychiatrist in general adult and community psychiatry at the County Durham and Darlington Priority Services NHS Trust. From 2005 to 2008 he held the chair of old age psychiatry at the University of Birmingham, UK. Later, he joined the Derbyshire Healthcare NHS Foundation Trust, serving as a full-time consultant general adult psychiatrist from 2008 to 2017. Most recently, from 2021 to 2022, he served as Consultant in Adult Psychiatry at NHS Tayside. Additionally, he has led committees at various national and international institutions. Furthermore, he founded the Global Psychiatric Association and has been serving as its president since its inception.

== Awards and honors ==
- 1998 – Young Investigator Award, Association of European Psychiatrists
- 2003 – Fellow, Association of European Psychiatrists
- 2016 – National Clinical Excellence Award, United Kingdom
