= Computational anatomy toolbox =

Brain imaging software package

Computational Anatomy Toolbox (CAT)
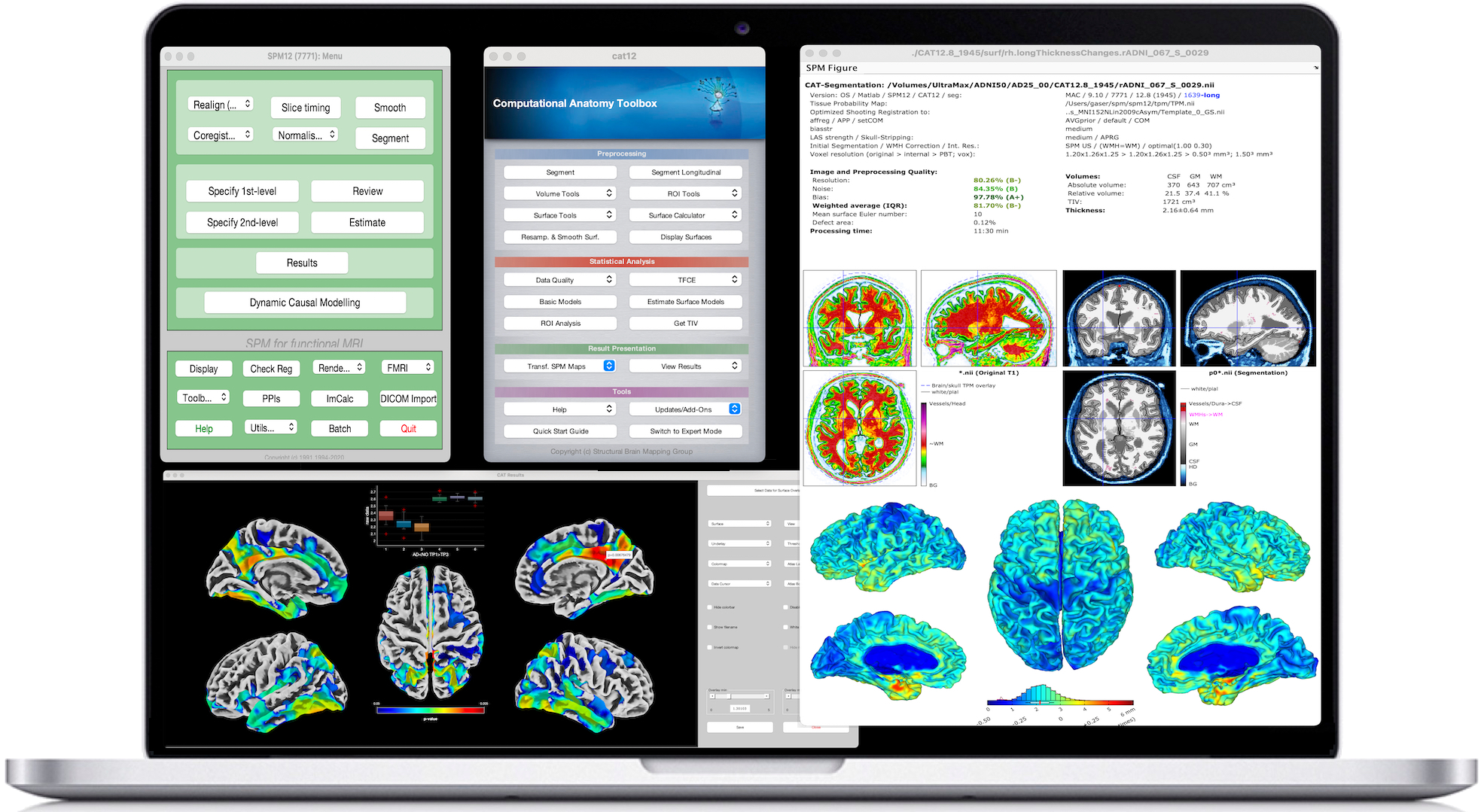
- Developers: Structural Brain Mapping Group; Christian Gaser; Robert Dahnke
- Stable release: 12.9 / 25 May 2024; 18 months ago
- Repository: github.com/ChristianGaser/cat12
- Written in: Matlab, C
- Operating system: Linux, macOS, Windows
- Platform: MATLAB, SPM
- Type: Neuroimaging data analysis
- License: GNU General Public License
- Website: neuro-jena.github.io/cat

CAT (computational anatomy toolbox) is a free and open source software package used for the analysis of structural brain imaging data, in particular magnetic resonance imaging (MRI). Developed by Christian Gaser and Robert Dahnke of the Structural Brain Mapping Group at the University of Jena, CAT is an extension of the SPM software.

== Functionality ==
CAT provides tools for voxel-based morphometry (VBM), cortical thickness, folding, and gyrification analysis, as well as volume or surface estimates within predefined brain regions of interest.

== Related software ==
- SPM
- FSL (FMRIB Software Library)
- AFNI
- Freesurfer
- Caret
