= Brain atlas =

Neuroanatomical map of the brain of a human or other animal

A brain atlas is composed of serial sections along different anatomical planes of the healthy or diseased developing or adult animal or human brain where each relevant brain structure is assigned a number of coordinates to define its outline or volume. Brain atlases are contiguous, comprehensive results of visual brain mapping and may include anatomical, genetic or functional features. A functional brain atlas is made up of $N$ regions of interest, where these regions are typically defined as spatially contiguous and functionally coherent patches of gray matter.

In most atlases, the three dimensions are: latero-lateral (x), dorso-ventral (y) and rostro-caudal (z). The possible sections are

- coronal
- sagittal
- transverse

Surface maps are sometimes used in addition to the 3D serial section maps

Besides the human brain, brain atlases exist for the brains of the mouse, rhesus macaques, Drosophila, pig and others.

Notable examples include the Allen Brain Atlas, BrainMaps, BigBrain, Infant Brain Atlas, and the work of the International Consortium for Brain Mapping (ICBM).

== See also ==
- Brain mapping
- Connectome
- Neuroanatomy
- Stereotaxic atlas
- Stereotaxy
