= Ictal-Interictal SPECT Analysis by SPM =

Tool for analyzing neuroimaging scans

ISAS (Ictal-Interictal SPECT Analysis by SPM) is an objective tool for analyzing ictal vs. interictal SPECT scans. The goal of ictal SPECT is to localize the region of seizure onset for epilepsy surgery planning. ISAS was introduced and validated in two recent studies (Chang et al., 2002; McNally et al., 2005). This site is a technical supplement to (McNally et al., 2005), which should enable ISAS to be implemented at any center for further study and analysis.

== Analysis ==
The basic idea of ISAS is to compute the difference between an ictal and interictal SPECT scan for a single patient. The differences of the ictal/inter-ictal comparison are checked against a healthy normal database to determine the normal expected variation. Significant increases and decreases in CBF (cerebral blood flow) between the interictal and ictal SPECT can then be detected. The analysis is conducted using SPM (statistical parametric mapping).

Cerebral blood flow is known to increase during seizures at the site of seizure onset. Since SPECT is an indicator of CBF, increases in the SPECT during seizures can be useful for seizure localization. CBF decreases are more complicated, and occur both during and following seizures in multiple locations. Details of ISAS interpretation can be found in McNally et al., 2005, but in summary:

1. For true ictal SPECT (patient injected before end of seizure), seizure onset can be reliably localized based on SPECT increases.

2. For post-ictal SPECT, seizure onset cannot be reliably localized to a single lobe based on SPECT increase or decreases. However, the side (L or R) of seizure onset can be reliably determined based on which hemisphere has greater overall SPECT decreases (hypoperfusion asymmetry index).

The requirements for implementing ISAS are relatively simple. All that is needed is a computer running MATLAB and an operator with sufficient imaging experience to download and implement the SPM (statistical parametric mapping) analysis.

NOTE: ISAS has been tested and confirmed to work with SPM2 and the following MATLAB versions - 6.1, 6.5.1, and 7.0.4. In order to ensure correctness, both Matlab and SPM should be kept updated with the latest service packs and patches. Refer to the software setup section of our site for more information.

The intent of ISAS and the ISAS website is to begin to fill the need for epilepsy SPECT image analysis, by providing a freely available method that can be implemented anywhere.

== Selected References ==
1. McNally KA, Paige AL, Varghese G, Zhang H, Novotny EJ, Spencer SS, Zubal IG, Blumenfeld H. (2005). Seizure localization by ictal and postictal SPECT. Epilepsia, 46(9):1–15, 2005

This study, together with the ISAS website, provides a complete description of the ISAS method, and validates this approach with a group of mesial temporal and neocortical epilepsy patients.

2. Chang DJ, Zubal IG, Gottschalk C, Necochea A, Stokking R, Studholme C, Corsi M, Slawski J, Spencer SS, Blumenfeld H (2002). Comparison of Statistical Parametric Mapping and SPECT Difference Imaging in Patients with Temporal Lobe Epilepsy. Epilepsia, 43:68-74.

ISAS was introduced in this study, and compared to conventional SPECT difference imaging.

3. Lee JD, Kim HJ, Lee BI, Kim OJ, Jeon TJ, Kim MJ (2000). Evaluation of ictal brain SPET using statistical parametric mapping in temporal lobe epilepsy. European Journal of Nuclear Medicine 27:1658-1665.

This paper is the first use of ictal SPECT analysis by SPM for seizure localization.

4. O'Brien TJ, So EL, Mullan BP, Hauser MF, Brinkmann BH, Bohnen NI, Hanson D, Cascino GD, Jack CR, Jr., Sharbrough FW (1998). Subtraction ictal SPECT co-registered to MRI improves clinical usefulness of SPECT in localizing the surgical seizure focus. Neurology, 50:445-454.

This paper describes SISCOM (subtraction ictal SPECT coregistered with MRI), a widely used method of ictal-interictal difference imaging (see also below).

5. Zubal IG, Spencer SS, Imam K, Seibyl J, Smith EO, Wisniewski G, Hoffer PB (1995). Difference images calculated from ictal and interictal technetium-99m-HMPAO SPECT scans of epilepsy. Journal of Nuclear Medicine, 36:684-689.

This is the first paper which describes the use of ictal-interictal difference imaging coregistered with MRI for epilepsy surgery localization.
