= Spinal Cord Toolbox =

- Developer: Polytechnique Montreal (NeuroPoly research laboratory)
- Release: 28 September 2013
- Stable release: 7.3 / 9 May 2026; 4 months ago
- Written in: Python
- Operating system: Linux, Mac OS X, Windows
- Size: 140 MB
- Available in: English
- Type: Digital imaging
- License: LGPLv3
- Repository: github.com/spinalcordtoolbox/spinalcordtoolbox

Spinal Cord Toolbox (SCT) is a suite of analysis tools optimized for spinal cord images acquired with magnetic resonance imaging. Main features include segmentation, registration and calculation of anatomical metrics.

== Features ==
- Propseg Automatic spinal cord segmentation.
- The PAM50 template is an anatomical template of the spinal cord that covers the full spinal cord and brainstem and is available for T1-, T2- and T2*-weighted MRI contrasts. The PAM50 template includes probabilistic segmentation of white matter, gray matter, CSF as well as probabilistic atlases of gray matter subregions and white matter pathways. The template also include segmentation of spinal levels for automatic assessment of metrics at specific locations.
- A White Matter atlas including 29 partial volume masks of which matter tracts.
