= Anders Dale =

American neuroscientist

Anders Martin Dale is a neuroscientist and professor of radiology, neurosciences, psychiatry, and cognitive science at the University of California, San Diego (UCSD), and he is one of the world's leading developers of computational neuroimaging techniques. He is the founding director of the Center for Multimodal Imaging Genetics (CMIG) at UCSD.

Dale founded and initially developed the brain imaging analysis software FreeSurfer as a graduate student at UCSD. He later co-developed FreeSurfer at Massachusetts General Hospital/Harvard Medical School with Bruce Fischl. In addition to FreeSurfer, his major scientific contributions include developing: a) event related functional magnetic resonance imaging (fMRI) (with Randy Buckner at Harvard), b) an in vivo method to quantify the gray matter thickness of the cerebral cortex using MRI images (with Bruce Fischl at Harvard), c) an analysis platform to combine fMRI with magnetoencephalography (MEG), d) computational morphometry to automatically label brain regions using MRI scans (with Bruce Fischl at Harvard and Rahul Desikan and Ron Killiany at Boston University), and e) MRI-based methodologies to quantify longitudinal change in brain regions (with Dominic Holland at UCSD).

Since 2013, in collaboration with Ole Andreassen at the University of Oslo, and using GWAS summary statistics (p-values and odds ratios), Dale has developed and validated methods for evaluating genetic overlap (pleiotropy) across diseases and phenotypes. These genetic pleiotropy methods have provided valuable insights across a number of diseases and identified novel single nucleotide polymorphisms associated with increased risk for schizophrenia, bipolar disorder, Alzheimer's disease, Parkinson's disease, frontotemporal dementia, corticobasal degeneration, hypertension, hypercholesterolemia and coronary artery disease. In collaboration with Rahul Desikan and Chun Fan, Dale has developed a polygenic score for quantifying the 'personalized' risk for quantifying Alzheimer's disease age of onset.

== Early life and education ==
Dale was born in Norway in 1964 to Major General Torstein Dale and Unn Søiland Dale. He went to college at the University of Texas from 1983 to 1985 and earned a B.A. in Computer Science, after which he served in the Norwegian Air Force. He then ran a small control systems consulting company. From 1989 to 1990 he went to Harvard and MIT on a Fulbright Fellowship, and received an M.S. in Engineering Science. He then pursued graduate studies at UCSD from 1989 to 1994.

During this period at UCSD, Dale began working on the development of accurate and automated algorithms for head segmentation, which is vital to the correct modeling of EEG/MEG and optical signals. He pioneered methods of combining EEG, MEG, and MRI tests to localize brain activity. He also did important work in surface-based MRI data analysis and in the mapping of the visual cortex. He received a Ph.D. in Cognitive Science in 1994, becoming one of the first graduates of UCSD's Cognitive Science Department.

In a 2003 interview, Dale explained that he had "always been interested in using quantitative modeling methods and simulations to answer biological questions, "and that as a Harvard student he had been "interested in approaching connectionist neural networks from a more biological angle." When he went to UCSD to continue his graduate work his interest "shifted to learning how to test models of how the brain works. Ideally you'd like to test your models not in anesthetized animals and brain slices, but by measuring brain activity in humans non-invasively. I wanted to study normal people doing normal tasks. That was what brought me to imaging. My goal was to see what kind of things we can measure non-invasively that can be quantitatively related to the models we want to build....I wanted to know what exactly we are measuring, how can you model it, and how can you relate the signal to what is going on in the brain physiologically...at a level that say you could measure invasively and that you could relate to parameters of quantitative models." His thesis work at UCSD, he said, "was on the EEG and MEG forward and inverse problems, and how to use anatomical information to constrain the solutions. It is clear that if you only use EEG or MEG measures, the spatial precision is not good enough to make inferences at a scale that's most useful to neuroscience. That led us into trying to use information with higher spatial resolution to constrain or bias our estimations of the signal sources in the brain."

== Athinoula A. Martinos Center for Biomedical Imaging and Harvard professorship ==
After completing his postgraduate work at UCSD, Dale returned to the Boston area, where from 1996 to 2004 he was an associate professor of radiology at Harvard University and associate director of the Athinoula A. Martinos Center for Biomedical Imaging, which is jointly operated by the Massachusetts General Hospital, Harvard Medical School, and MIT. During this period at Harvard, Dale continued to develop noninvasive imaging technologies and used structural MRI to diagnose neurological disorders. It was toward the end of his graduate-student days at Harvard and during his postdoctoral stay at UCSD, Dale later said, that he began working with MRI and fMRI. "The field had just gotten started," he explained. "We tried to use cortical surface reconstruction from MRI to constrain the localization of EEG and MEG signals. We also used those geometrical representations of the cortex, combined with functional MRI, to look for maps in the visual cortex. Steve Engel at Stanford had just developed the phase-encoded stimulus paradigm. He showed that if you present subjects with expanding annulus and rotating wedges, you can apply Fourier analysis to fMRI signals on a voxel-by-voxel basis, and obtain a delay map, or an estimate of the retinotopic representation. We thought up the idea of looking at these maps on the cortical surface, because the maps are actually two-dimensional. Although the topology of these maps is simple, their folding makes them complex in volume. In order to visualize and analyze the patterns of brain activity, you really need to take into account the individual geometry of the cortex. So we decided to do an experiment. We went to Massachusetts General Hospital, and tried our little experiment on a weekend....It worked very well and the results got into Science."

During this period, Dale and Bruce Fischl, a colleague at Harvard Medical School and Massachusetts General Hospital, continued to develop the brain imaging analysis software known as FreeSurfer, which Dale had begun working on at UCSD.

== Multi-Modal Imaging Laboratory and UCSD professorship ==
Dale has been professor of radiology, neurosciences, psychiatry, and cognitive science at UCSD since 2004, and is the founding co-director of UCSD's Multi-Modal Imaging Laboratory (MMIL), which the university's website describes as "an interdisciplinary initiative of the Departments of Neurosciences and Radiology." Dale is "the designated point person" in both departments "for integrating the various modes and methods of collecting imaging data, including functional MRI (fMRI), magnetoencephalography (MEG), electroencephalography (EEG), and optical imaging." Dale's efforts, the website states, "are directed in three areas: continuing development and refinement of accurate and automated algorithms for evaluation subjects using multimodality approaches to data collection; statistical analysis of data; and conducting studies in animal models using optical imaging, high field fMRI, and electrophysiological recordings to enhance the interpretation of neuroimaging studies." His work has "resulted in the development of software tools that enable the automated segmentation of the entire head and brain, including the neocortex and subcortical structures, from MRI data." Most recently, Dale and his laboratory colleagues have been using the methods they have developed to assess regional morphometric alterations resulting from aging and from such afflictions as schizophrenia, Alzheimer's disease, and Huntington's disease.

According to a UCSD website, the work of Dale's laboratory at UCSD has yield several other technological developments, including "a method for tracking and correcting for head motion, in real time, during MRI scans; a fully automated method for identifying white matter tracts from MRI scans; and a method for quantifying longitudinal anatomical change from serial MRI scans." In addition, the laboratory has produced "a free software program that aids in the study of anatomical changes associated with early stages of Alzheimer's disease and Mild Cognitive Impairment (MCI). This technology, developed for the Alzheimer's Disease Neuroimaging Initiative (ADNI), involves longitudinal MRI and PET scans as well as CSF biomarkers in a large number of patients." Dale has also initiated a number of "collaborative efforts using neuroimaging methods to study the genetic and environmental influences on brain structure and development" and that an "FDA-approved version of his automated segmentation technology is now in routine use for quantitative assessment of regional atrophy in patients under clinical evaluation for AD/MCI at UCSD."

In 2009, the National Institute on Drug Abuse (NIDA), a part of the National Institutes of Health (NIH). awarded a grant of $8,950,590 under the American Recovery and Reinvestment Act (ARRA) to fund a project at UCSD, the Pediatric Imaging, Neurocognition, and Genetics Study (PING), in which Dale played a major role. The study made use of "sophisticated gene-mapping tools and imaging technology to collect a wealth of data about brain development in children." Dale said that "Our major aim is to create a database – essentially a map depicting the genomic landscape of the developing human brain – as a resource for the scientific community. As a result of the PING project, Dale and his fellow researchers "developed a multidimensional set of brain measurements that, when taken together, can accurately assess a child's age with 92 percent accuracy."

== CorTechs Labs ==
In 2001 Dale co-founded with Áine Behan the neuroimaging company CorTechs Labs Incorporated in La Jolla, California, for which he serves as Chief Scientific Advisor.

CorTechs Labs describes itself as "a group of scientists, engineers, business professionals, and clinical specialists dedicated to bringing cutting edge brain image analysis technologies to the commercial market." These technologies "may help physicians to more effectively diagnose and treat serious neurological disorders that affect millions of patients worldwide. It is our mission to effectively translate the fruits of such research into routine clinical practice."

CorTechs's website explains that it "is currently bringing to market our next-generation clinical brain morphometry product, NeuroQuant®," a device that "automatically derives critical quantitative anatomical from brain MRIs and compares them to data from healthy individuals, in rough analogy to the normative information that quantitative reports from blood tests provide about molecular markers. Neurologists, neuroradiologists, and other experts in the diagnosis and treatment of CNS disorders can use this product to derive adjunctive information that may aid in the detection and treatment of disease processes in individual patients. This tool can also provide sensitive imaging biomarkers that may reduce the expense and duration of clinical trials." In addition, CorTechs has been provided with funding by the U.S. National Institute of Aging "to use data collected from the NIH and pharmaceutical-industry co-sponsored Alzheimer's Disease Neuroimaging Initiative (ADNI) project, to establish an indication for use for NeuroQuant® as an adjunctive tool in the assessment of patients with AD." NeuroQuant® has since been studied in a variety of neurological pathologies beyond its initial intended purpose for Alzheimer's Disease such as traumatic brain injury (TBI) and epilepsy.

== Other professional activities ==
Dale was on the consulting faculty of the NIMH Training Program in Cognitive Neuroscience 2011–2012.

== Awards ==
- 1998 John Wiley & Sons, Ltd. Young Investigator Award for Human Brain Mapping
- 1994-1996 Norwegian Research Council Career Development Award
- 1990-1994 McDonnell-Pew Fellow at UCSD
- 1988 Fulbright Fellowship at Harvard University
- 2022 Olav Thon International Research Prize

== Selected publications ==
Dale has published articles across numerous scientific and medical disciplines, in a wide range of journals including Science, Nature, Neuron, PNAS, PLOS Genetics, Plos Medicine, Molecular Psychiatry, Annals of Neurology, Acta Neuropathologica, Radiology, and Circulation.

- McDonald, Carrie R.; Thesen, Thomas; Carlson, Chad; Blumberg, Mark; Girard, Holly M.; Trongnetrpunya, Amy; Sherfey, Jason S.; Devinsky, Orrin; Kuzniecky, Rubin; Dolye, Werner K. (2010). "Multimodal imaging of repetition priming: Using fMRI, MEG, and intracranial EEG to reveal spatiotemporal profiles of word processing". NeuroImage. 53 (2): 707–17. doi:10.1016/j.neuroimage.2010.06.069. PMC 2930128. PMID 20620212.
- Leonard, Matthew K.; Brown, Timothy T.; Travis, Katherine E.; Gharapetian, Lusineh; Hagler, Donald J.; Dale, Anders M.; Elman, Jeffrey L.; Halgren, Eric (2010). "Spatiotemporal dynamics of bilingual word processing". NeuroImage. 49 (4): 3286–94. doi:10.1016/j.neuroimage.2009.12.009. PMC 2824560. PMID 20004256.
- Leonard, Matthew K.; Torres, Christina; Travis, Katherine E.; Brown, Timothy T.; Hagler, Donald J.; Dale, Anders M.; Elman, Jeffrey L.; Halgren, Eric (2011). "Language Proficiency Modulates the Recruitment of Non-Classical Language Areas in Bilinguals". PLOS ONE. 6 (3) e18240. Bibcode:2011PLoSO...618240L. doi:10.1371/journal.pone.0018240. PMC 3063800. PMID 21455315.
- Travis, Katherine E.; Leonard, Matthew K.; Brown, Timothy T.; Hagler, Donald J.; Curran, Megan; Dale, Anders M.; Elman, Jeffrey L.; Halgren, Eric (2011). "Spatiotemporal Neural Dynamics of Word Understanding in 12- to 18-Month-Old-Infants". Cerebral Cortex. 21 (8): 1832–9. doi:10.1093/cercor/bhq259. PMC 3138516. PMID 21209121.
