= Neuroimaging Informatics Tools and Resources Clearinghouse =

Neuroimaging informatics knowledge environment

The Neuroimaging Informatics Tools and Resources Clearinghouse

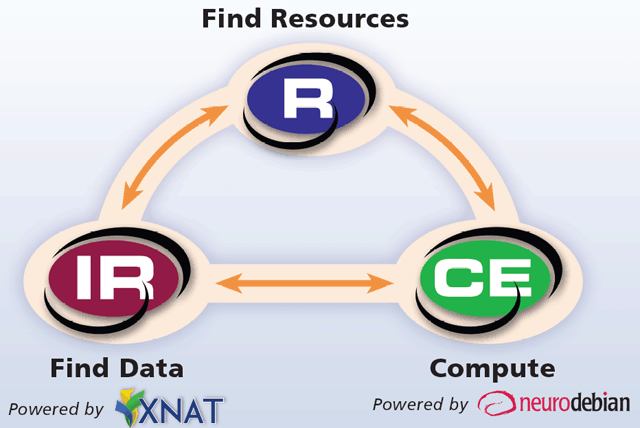
- Web-based neuroimaging informatics tools and resources: collaborate, test, and compute
- Website type: Collaborative, Software Development Management System, Data Sets, Computational Environment
- Website: www.nitrc.org
- Users: Over 300,000

The Neuroimaging Tools and Resources Collaboratory (NITRC) is a neuroimaging informatics knowledge environment for MR, PET/SPECT, CT, EEG/MEG, optical imaging, clinical neuroinformatics, imaging genomics, and computational neuroscience tools and resources.

== Description ==
Initiated in 2006 and currently funded by NIH Grant number: 1R24EB029173 , NITRC's mission is to provide a user-friendly knowledge environment that enables the distribution, enhancement, and adoption of neuroimaging tools and resources and has expanded from MR to Imaging Genomics, EEG/MEG, PET/SPECT, CT, optical imaging, clinical neuroinformatics, and computational neuroscience. Supporting 143,000 page views per month, NITRC's 1,000+ tools and resources have been downloaded over 11.4 million times by 1.4 million users.

NITRC's goal is to support researchers dedicated to enhancing, adopting, distributing, and contributing to the evolution of previously funded neuroimaging analysis tools and resources for broader community use. Promoting software tools, workflows, resources, vocabularies, test data, and pre-processed, community-generated images through its Image Repository (NITRC-IR), NITRC gives researchers greater and more efficient access to the tools and resources they need; better categorizing and organizing existing tools and resources via a controlled vocabulary; facilitating interactions between researchers and developers through forums, direct email contact, ratings and reviews; and promoting better use through enhanced documentation.

== Approach ==
To meet the disparate needs of neuroimaging informatics developers and researchers, NITRC offers collaborative functionality similar to that found in platforms such as GitHub and SourceForge. To provide such functionality, they customized the open-source GForge project. Thus, within NITRC, each tool or resource has the option to offer descriptive content as well as use MediaWiki, CVS/SVN, bug tracking, news, and forums to distribute information and downloads. Housed on NITRC servers and linked out to existing Web sites, NITRC is the source for neuroimaging informatics tools and resources.

Launched in 2007 with an agile programming schedule, the NITRC team continues to prioritize and implement functional and design enhancements to make the Web site even more accessible. While the scientific scope expands so do NITRC's Enhanced Services, which include its Image Repository to support image data sharing and its Computational Environment service on Amazon Marketplace to support the execution of complex computational analysis of image data.

== Services ==
The Neuroimaging Informatics Tools and Resources Clearinghouse (NITRC) suite of services include:

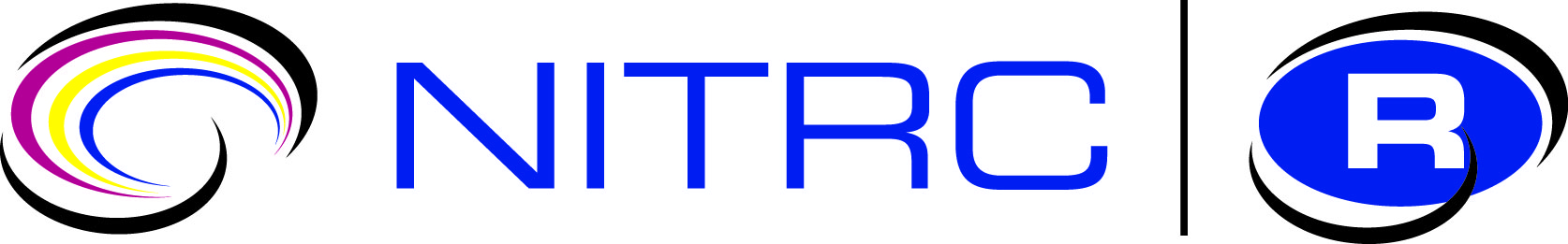

NITRC Resource Repository (NITRC-R) is the “go to” collaboration environment that enables the worldwide distribution, enhancement, and adoption of neuroinformatics tools and resources. NITRC-R's scientific scope includes MR, PET/SPECT, CT, EEG/MEG, optical imaging, clinical neuroinformatics, imaging genomics, and most recently, computational neuroscience.

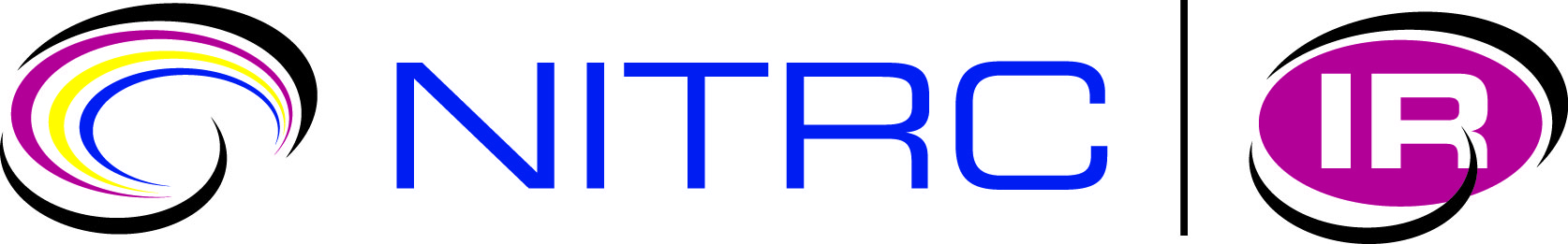

NITRC Image Repository (NITRC-IR), built on XNAT, is a curated repository of DICOM and NIfTI scanned images searchable by metadata such as diagnosis, handedness, gender, or group. NITRC-IR datasets include: Functional Connectomes, Autism Brain Imaging Data Exchange (ABIDE), Sample, ADHD-200, Beijing Eyes Open Eyes Shut.

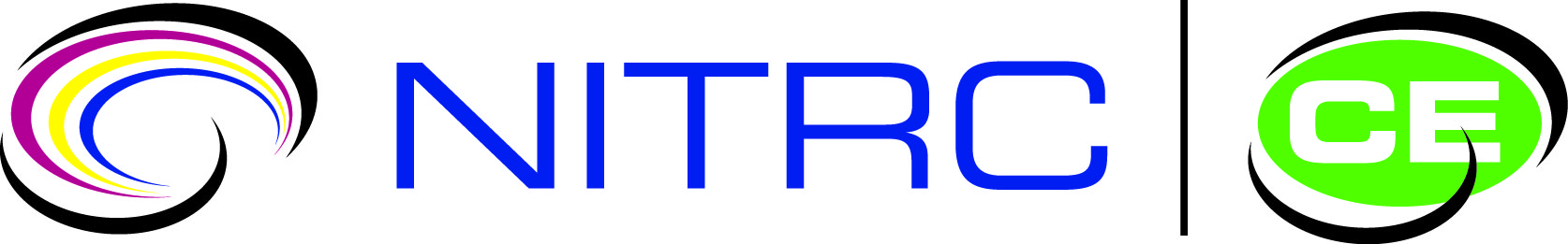

NITRC Computational Environment (NITRC-CE) is a virtual big data compute service pre-configured with popular neuroimaging software analysis tools allowing pay-as-you-go compute time. Using AWS EC2, and leveraging NeuroDebian, NITRC-CE and NITRC-CE for Cluster Compute Instances are available via the AWS Marketplace. A public Amazon Machine Instance (AMI) is also available.

== Results ==
NITRC's triad of services serves the global neuroinformatics research community, with 64% of its users coming from the United States, China, Germany, the United Kingdom, and Canada. With over 3.2 million page views and 747,000 visits by 335,200 unique visitors, NITRC-R facilitates access to an ever-growing number of neuroinformatics tools and resources (630). NITRC-IR offers 4,800 subjects searchable across 9 projects to promote reuse and integration of these valuable shared data. Averaging 20,900 visits and 76,200 pageviews per month, software and data from NITRC-R and NITRC-IR have been downloaded over 1.3 million times. NITRC-CE provides simplified deployment of cloud-based computation that supports FreeSurfer, FSL, AFNI, and many other software resources. In real-world processing tests, a representative computation that would have taken 24 hours on a high-powered desktop took 25% of the time (6 hours) at a cost of only $4. The test was an FSL voxel-based morphometry (VBM) computation on 64 subjects from CANDIShare, run on a 2.8 GHz Intel Xeon Mac desktop versus an AWS Large instance (m1.large) using SGE parallelization over 4 cores.

== Participants ==
NITRC is led by the University of Massachusetts Medical School in Worcester, MA, and is built and operated in collaboration with TCG, Inc. of Washington, DC; Preuss Enterprises, Inc., FL; and The Paulson Venture, CA. NITRC-R and NITRC-IR are hosted by the Center for Research in Biological Systems at the University of California, San Diego. Current team members include David Kennedy and Christian Haselgrove, UMMS; Nina Preuss, PMP, Preuss Enterprises Inc.; Matthew Travers and Al Crowley, TCG, Inc.; and Abby Paulson, The Paulson Venture.

== See also ==
- List of neuroimaging software
- List of neuroscience databases
