= FMRIB Software Library =

Free software library

FMRIB Software Library (FSL)
- Developer: FMRIB Analysis Group
- Stable release: 6.0.7.18 / 22 May 2025; 17 months ago
- Written in: C++, TCL
- Operating system: Linux, macOS
- Available in: English
- Type: Scientific visualization and image computing
- License: Custom, non-commercial
- Website: fsl.fmrib.ox.ac.uk/fsl/fslwiki/FSL

Example FSL GUIs

The FMRIB Software Library, abbreviated FSL, is a software library containing image analysis and statistical tools for functional, structural and diffusion MRI brain imaging data.

FSL is available as both precompiled binaries and source code for Apple and PC (Linux) computers. It is freely available for non-commercial use.

== FSL Functionality ==
Functional MRI
FABBER	FABBER is a Bayesian model fitting tool intended for use in task modelling of ASL data.
FEAT	Model-based FMRI analysis with straightforward but powerful GUI: data preprocessing (including slice timing correction, MCFLIRT motion correction and PRELUDE+FUGUE EPI unwarping); FILM GLM timeseries analysis with prewhitening; registration to structural and/or standard space images; and fully generalised mixed-effects group analysis using advanced Bayesian techniques.
MELODIC	Model-free FMRI analysis using Probabilistic Independent Component Analysis (PICA). MELODIC automatically estimates the number of interesting noise and signal sources in the data and because of the associated "noise model", is able to assign significances ("p-values") to the output spatial maps.
FLOBS	Generation of optimal HRF basis functions and Bayesian activation estimation.
SMM	Spatial mixture modelling – alternative hypothesis testing using histogram mixture modelling with spatial regularisation of the voxel classification into activation and non-activation.
Structural MRI
BET / BET2	Brain Extraction Tool – segments brain from non-brain in structural and functional data, and models skull and scalp surfaces.
SUSAN	Nonlinear noise reduction.
FAST	FMRIB's Automated Segmentation Tool – brain segmentation (into different tissue types) and bias field correction.
FLIRT	FMRIB's Linear Image Registration Tool – linear inter- and intra-modal registration.
FUGUE	Unwarps geometric distortion in EPI images using B_{0} field maps.
SIENA	Structural brain change analysis, for estimating brain atrophy.
Diffusion MRI
FDT	FMRIB's Diffusion Toolbox – tools for low-level diffusion parameter reconstruction and probabilistic tractography.
TBSS	Tract-Based Spatial Statistics (part of FMRIB's Diffusion Toolbox) – voxelwise analysis of multi-subject diffusion data.
Other tools
Inference	Various inference/thresholding tools, including: Randomise (permutation-based inference tool for nonparametric statistical thresholding), cluster (cluster-based thresholding using GRF theory for inference), FDR (false discovery rate inference) and Glm (a GUI for creating model design matrices).
FSLeyes	Interactive display tool for 3D and 4D data.
AVWUTILS	Misc utils for converting and processing images.

== History and development ==
FSL is written mainly by members of the FMRIB (Functional Magnetic Resonance Imaging of the Brain) Analysis Group, Oxford University, UK. The first release of FSL was in 2000; there has been approximately one major new release each year to date. The FMRIB Analysis Group is primarily funded by the Wellcome Trust and the UK EPSRC and MRC Research Councils.

== See also ==
- AFNI
- FreeSurfer
- Computational anatomy toolbox
- SPM
- Neuroimaging
