= FreeSurfer =

Brain imaging software package

- Developer: Martinos Center for Biomedical Imaging
- Stable release: 8.1.0
- Operating system: Linux or Mac OS X
- Type: Neuroimaging data analysis
- License: FreeSurfer Software License
- Website: FreeSurfer
- Repository: github.com/freesurfer/freesurfer

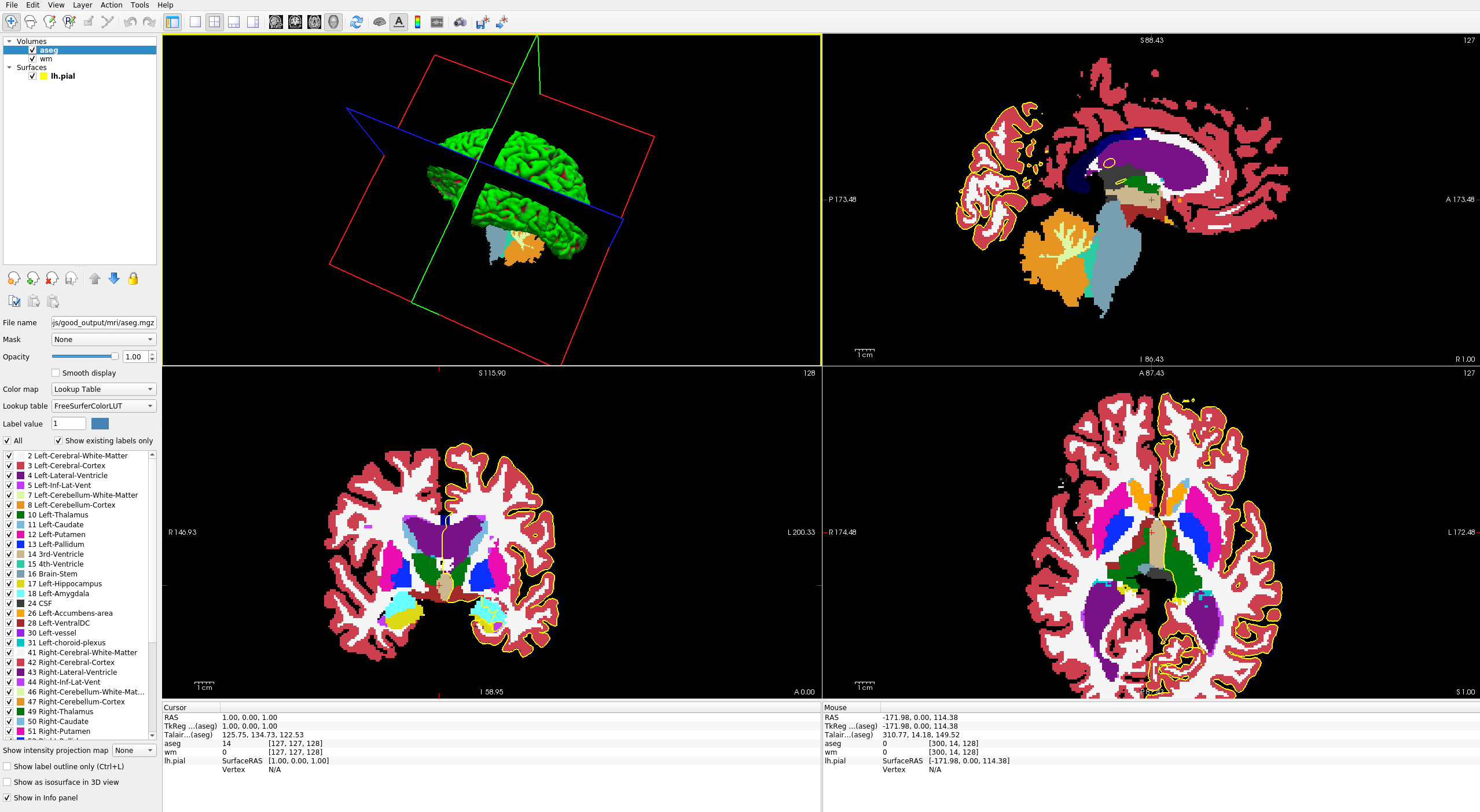
A screen capture of the FreeView application included in FreeSurfer.

FreeSurfer is brain imaging software originally developed by Bruce Fischl, Anders Dale, Martin Sereno, and Doug Greve. Development and maintenance of FreeSurfer is now the primary responsibility of the Laboratory for Computational Neuroimaging at the Athinoula A. Martinos Center for Biomedical Imaging. FreeSurfer contains a set of programs with a common focus of analyzing magnetic resonance imaging (MRI) scans of brain tissue. It is an important tool in functional brain mapping and contains tools to conduct both volume based and surface based analysis. FreeSurfer includes tools for the reconstruction of topologically correct and geometrically accurate models of both the gray/white and pial surfaces, for measuring cortical thickness, surface area and folding, and for computing inter-subject registration based on the pattern of cortical folds.

57,541 copies of the FreeSurfer software package have been registered for use as of April 2022 and it is a core tool in the processing pipelines of the Human Connectome Project, the UK Biobank, the Adolescent Brain Cognitive Development Study, and the Alzheimer's Disease Neuroimaging Initiative.

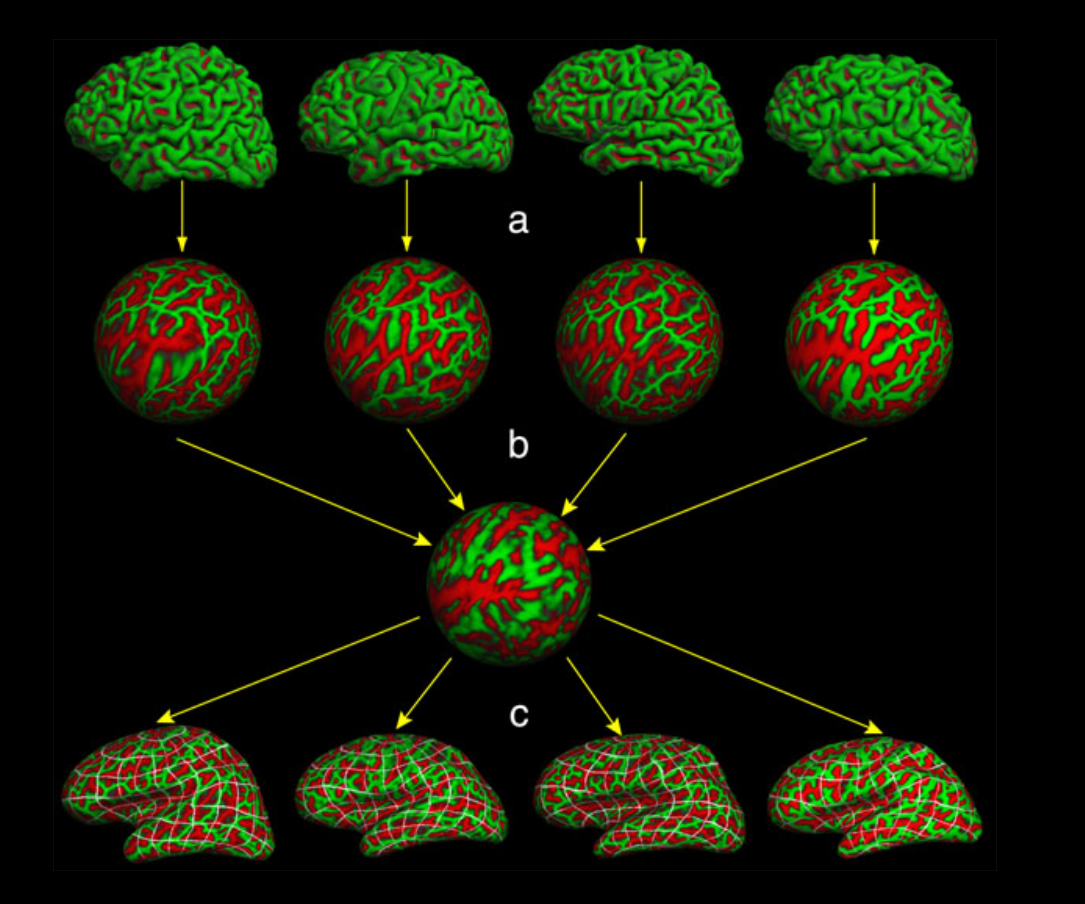
FreeSurfer morphs cortical surfaces onto spheres to aide in inter-subject comparisons.

== Usage ==
The FreeSurfer processing stream is controlled by a shell script called recon-all. The script calls component programs that organize raw MRI images into formats easily usable for morphometric and statistical analysis. FreeSurfer automatically segments the volume and parcellates the surface into standardized regions of interest (ROIs). Freesurfer uses a morphed spherical method to average across subjects for statistical (general linear model) analysis with the mri_glmfit tool. FreeSurfer contains a range of packages allowing a broad spectrum of uses, including:

- FreeView, a tool to visualize FreeSurfer output, which can also display common MRI image formats
- TRACULA, a tool to construct white matter tract data from diffusion images
- FSFAST, a tool for analysis of functional MRI data
- XHemi, for Interhemispheric registration
- LGI, to calculate the degree of folding or local GI
- a Matlab toolbox for linear mixed effects models

== Interoperation ==
FreeSurfer interoperates easily with the FMRIB Software Library (FSL), a comprehensive library for image analysis written by the Functional MRI of the Brain (FMRIB) group at Oxford, UK. The functional activation results obtained using either the FreeSurfer Functional Analysis Stream (FS-FAST) or the FSL tools can be overlaid onto inflated, sphered or flattened cortical surfaces using FreeSurfer. Data from Statistical Parametric Mapping (SPM) can be integrated into FreeSurfer data sets through tools included in the FreeSurfer package. FreeSurfer also uses toolkits from MNI MINC, VXL, Tcl/Tk/Tix/BLT, VTK., KWWidgets and Qt, which are all available with the distribution. Other neuroimaging programs like Caret, AFNI/SUMA, MNE, and 3D Slicer can also import data processed by FreeSurfer.

== Download ==
FreeSurfer runs on Mac OS and Linux. Free registration and binary installation are available without a cost, but a license key (text file) is necessary to run the FreeSurfer binaries. Documentation can be found on the FreeSurfer Wiki and limited support is available from the developers and community through the FreeSurfer mailing list.

== Selected references ==
The following is a sample of references the FreeSurfer team recommends researchers cite when publishing findings obtained through FreeSurfer. Citation counts have been obtained through Google Scholar as of August 2019.

| Title | Year | Citations |
|---|---|---|
| Cortical surface-based analysis. I. Segmentation and surface reconstruction. | 1999 | 6469 |
| Cortical surface-based analysis. II: Inflation, flattening, and a surface-based coordinate system. | 1999 | 4507 |
| High-resolution intersubject averaging and a coordinate system for the cortical surface. | 1999 | 2339 |
| Measuring the thickness of the human cerebral cortex from magnetic resonance images. | 2000 | 3863 |
| Automated manifold surgery: constructing geometrically accurate and topologically correct models of the human cerebral cortex. | 2001 | 1258 |
| Whole brain segmentation: automated labeling of neuroanatomical structures in the human brain. | 2002 | 5066 |
| A hybrid approach to the skull stripping problem in MRI. | 2004 | 1584 |
| Automatically parcellating the human cerebral cortex. | 2004 | 2731 |
| An automated labeling system for subdividing the human cerebral cortex on MRI scans into gyral based regions of interest. | 2006 | 4932 |

== See also ==
- Analysis of Functional NeuroImages
- Caret Van Essen Lab, Washington University in St. Louis
- Laboratory of Neuro Imaging, UCLA
- Statistical parametric mapping (SPM)
- Computational anatomy toolbox
- Anastasia Yendiki
