= Helen S. Mayberg =

American neurologist

- Born: California
- Citizenship: United States
- Education: University of California, Los Angeles (B.A. Psychobiology 1976); University of California, Irvine (Graduate studies: Department of Radiological Sciences); University of Southern California, School of Medicine (M.D. 1981); Columbia University College of Physicians and Surgeons New York (Resident, Neurology); Johns Hopkins School of Medicine (Research Fellow, Department of Radiology, 1985–1987)
- Medical career
- Profession: Researcher, Professor, Medical Doctor
- Field: Psychiatry, Behavioral sciences, Neurology, Radiology

Helen S. Mayberg (born 1956 in California), is an American neurologist. Mayberg is known in particular for her work delineating abnormal brain function in patients with major depression using functional neuroimaging. This work led to the first pilot study of deep brain stimulation (DBS), a reversible method of selective modulation of a specific brain circuit, for patients with treatment-resistant depression. As of August 2019, she has published 211 original peer-reviewed articles, 31 books and book chapters, and acted as principal investigator on 24 research grants. Mayberg is coinventor with Andres Lozano of “Method for Treating Depression Mood Disorders and Anxiety Disorders using Neuromodulation,” US patent 2005/0033379A1. St. Jude Medical Neuromodulation licensed her intellectual property to develop Subcallosal Cingulate Deep Brain Stimulation for Treatment-Resistant Unipolar and Bipolar Depression (SCC DBS) for the treatment of severe depression. As of 2018, Mayberg holds positions as Professor of Neurology and Neurosurgery and Professor, Psychiatry and Neuroscience, both at Mount Sinai Medical School, and Professor of Psychiatry, Emory University; Emory University Hospital. Since 2018, she has served as Director, Nash Family Center for Advanced Circuit Therapeutics at the Icahn School of Medicine at Mount Sinai.

== Research ==
Mayberg's research in neurology came about through observations that the psychological diagnoses of mental disorders was not aided by, or backed up by, neurological evidence—and that developing a system of mapping the circuitry of brain activity would allow for more objective diagnoses and treatment.

Mayberg studies depression and integrates neuroimaging strategies such as Positron emission tomography (PET), sMRI, fMRI, DTI, and EEG as well as behavioral and psychophysiological metrics to define brain mechanisms and testing of antidepressant treatments. She develops imaging biomarkers and algorithms that discriminate patient subgroups and optimize treatment selection in the management of individual patients across all stages of illness. She also concentrates on testing deep brain stimulation for treatment resistant depression, bringing together electro physiologists, engineers, imaging scientists and clinicians to refine, optimize and extend the treatment of depression and other neuropsychiatric disorders.

Since the 1990s, electric stimulation of parts of the brain have been used to treat Parkinsons. The origins of DBS date back to the 1930s.

One deep brain stimulation treatment for depression, developed by Mayberg and colleagues, placed electrodes in the Broadmann area 25 of the brain in severely depressed patients. Initial results were encouraging, though clinical trials were deemed futile and ultimately halted; however, there were positive changes in the success rate of the trial after the trial was halted. As a result, she resumed research on her hypothesis. Area 25 is connected to parts of the brain that are related to observable depression traits, such as appetite and sleeping habits. Her hypothesis is sometimes described as a pacemaker for the brain: electronic pulses that correct both the cause and the symptoms of depression. Current research looks into why some patients respond to DBS and others do not. To this end, a study led by Dr. Mayberg showed that brief intraoperative exposure to therapeutic stimulation at the time of implantation surgery induces rapid and consistent electrophysiological brain state change—indexed by a decrease in Beta wave measured at the site of stimulation. These intraoperative brain state changes are seen in individual subjects and are correlated with a significant and sustained reduction in depressive symptoms outside of the operating room without additional stimulation, establishing reduction in beta power as a novel biomarker for DBS treatment optimization.

=== Grants ===
A partial list of recent grants:

Grants, Contracts and Foundation Sources
Title and No.	Role	Direct Costs (USD)
Emory-MSSM-GSK-NIMH Collaborative Mood-Anxiety Disorders Initiative, NIMH - U19 MH069056-09	Principal Investigator	$11,133,630
Psychophysiological Assessment of DBS Effects in TRD Phase II, Hope for Depression Research Foundation	Principal Investigator	$550,000
Predictors of Antidepressant Treatment Response: The Emory CIDAR, NIMH - P50 MH077083-01	Principal Investigator	$7,500,000
Multimodal Assessment of DBS Effects in TRD Phase I, Hope for Depression Research Foundation	Principal Investigator	$400,000

=== Related activities ===
==== Meditation and depression ====
In 2017, Mayberg and the 14th Dalai Lama of Tibet attended a conference on mindfulness and the impact of meditation on the brain. The Dalai Lama was interested in whether the brain impacts the mind or if it might be the other way around. Mayberg pointed out the impact of DBS on severely depressed individuals. Their informal hypothesis was that, based on experiments that examined brain behavior from people practicing meditation, and experiments involving DBS, it was likely that meditation could improve brain waves that are important to mental health — yet when a patient experiences a certain degree of depression, it takes biological treatment to restore the patient to where they can meditate at all.

==== Neuroethics ====
Mayberg gave a presentation in 2014 at the Presidential Commission for the Study of Bioethical Issues, where she expressed her clinical and experiential lessons in neuroethics. Her commentary focused on how severely depressed patients are rarely irrational, and that there needs to be open communication and a two-way understanding of expectations. She also asserted in publications that DBS patients should have their own words reflected in the medical literature.

==== Neurolaw ====
Neurolaw, related to Neurocriminology, is based on the concept that MRI and PET scans as well as other means of examining of a person’s brain composition, can be used to hold harmless an alleged perpetrator in a court of law. Or, conversely, to justify a conviction. Adrian Raine was among those who postulated this theory in the 1980s, and it gained attention in the press after the trial and conviction of John Hinckley Jr.

Other scholars, including Mayberg, have argued in editorials and interviews that science of the brain cannot be used, at least at this point, to offer evidence for a conviction. By extension, it could be erroneously interpreted that brain analyses could predict a person’s potential for criminal behavior.

== Membership and awards ==
=== Memberships and associations ===
Mayberg is a member of the Governing Board of the International Neuroethics Society, the Institute of Medicine, the Dana Alliance and the NARSAD Scientific Advisory Board. She is active in the Society for Neuroscience, Society of Biological Psychiatry, American Neurological Association, American College of Neuropsychopharmacology, the Organization for Human Brain Mapping, and serves on the editorial boards of Human Brain Mapping (associate editor), NeuroImage, Clinical, Biological Psychiatry (ex officio editor), Brain Stimulation, Neuroinformatics, Neuromodulation (associate editor) and Brain Structure and Function.

=== Honors and awards ===
A list of honors and awards include election to Johns Hopkins University Society of Scholars (2018), recipient, Steven E. Hyman Award for Distinguished Service to the Field of Neuroethics (2018), elected to the National Academy of Medicine (2008); American Academy of Arts and Sciences (2017) and National Academy of Inventors, elected member (2016), V. Sagar Sethi Mental Health Research Award, Psychiatric Foundation of North Carolina (2016), the Gold Medal Award, Society of Biological Psychiatry (2014), Joan and Stanford Alexander Award in Psychiatry (2013), the Robert J. and Claire Pasarow Foundation Medical Research Award (2013), and others.

== Publications ==
Partial list of original peer-reviewed articles ranked by citations:

- Mayberg, HS; Liotti, M; Brannan, SK; McGinnis, S; Mahurin, RK; Jerabek, PA; Silva, JA; Tekell, JL; Martin, CC; Lancaster, JL; Fox, PT (1999). "Reciprocal limbic-cortical function and negative mood: converging PET findings in depression and normal sadness". Am J Psychiatry. 156 (5): 675–82. doi:10.1176/ajp.156.5.675. PMID 10327898. S2CID 16258492. Citations: 2557
- Biswal, BB; Mennes, M; Zuo, XN; et al. (March 2010). "Toward discovery science of human brain function". Proc. Natl. Acad. Sci. U.S.A. 107 (10): 4734–9. Bibcode:2010PNAS..107.4734B. doi:10.1073/pnas.0911855107. PMC 2842060. PMID 20176931. Citations: 2100
- Mayberg, HS (1997). "Limbic-cortical dysregulation: a proposed model of depression". J Neuropsychiatry Clin Neurosci. 9 (3): 471–81. doi:10.1176/jnp.9.3.471. PMID 9276848. Citations: 1507
- Goldapple, K; Segal, Z; Garson, C; Lau, M; Bieling, P; Kennedy, S; Mayberg, H (2004). "Modulation of cortical-limbic pathways in major depression: treatment-specific effects of cognitive behavior therapy". Arch Gen Psychiatry. 61 (1): 34–41. doi:10.1001/archpsyc.61.1.34. PMID 14706942. Citations: 1321
- Farb, NA; Segal, ZV; Mayberg, H; Bean, J; McKeon, D; Fatima, Z; Anderson, AK (2007). "Attending to the present: mindfulness meditation reveals distinct neural modes of self-reference". Soc Cogn Affect Neurosci. 2 (4): 313–22. doi:10.1093/scan/nsm030. PMC 2566754. PMID 18985137. Citations: 1163
- Mayberg, HS (2003). "Modulating dysfunctional limbic-cortical circuits in depression: towards development of brain-based algorithms for diagnosis and optimised treatment". Br Med Bull. 65: 193–207. doi:10.1093/bmb/65.1.193. PMID 12697626. Citations: 1156
- Mayberg, HS; Brannan, SK; Mahurin, RK; Jerabek, PA; Brickman, JS; Tekell, JL; Silva, JA; McGinnis, S; Glass, TG; Martin, CC; Fox, PT (1997). "Cingulate function in depression: a potential predictor of treatment response". NeuroReport. 8 (4): 1057–61. doi:10.1097/00001756-199703030-00048. PMID 9141092. S2CID 32709385. Citations: 1127
- Mayberg, HS; Brannan, SK; Tekell, JL; Silva, JA; Mahurin, RK; McGinnis, S; Jerabek, PA (2000). "Regional metabolic effects of fluoxetine in major depression: serial changes and relationship to clinical response". Biol Psychiatry. 48 (8): 830–43. doi:10.1016/s0006-3223(00)01036-2. PMID 11063978. S2CID 634661. Citations: 961
- Thomas, M; Sing, H; Belenky, G; et al. (December 2000). "Neural basis of alertness and cognitive performance impairments during sleepiness. I. Effects of 24 h of sleep deprivation on waking human regional brain activity". J Sleep Res. 9 (4): 335–52. doi:10.1046/j.1365-2869.2000.00225.x. PMID 11123521. S2CID 35893889. Citations: 961
