= Robert Schug =

American forensic psychologist

Robert Schug is an American forensic psychologist specializing in neurocriminology and clinical psychology. As an associate professor at California State University, Long Beach (CSULB), he co-runs a neuroscience laboratory, focusing on research that integrates a biopsychosocial perspective into studies of traumatic brain injury, criminal offenders, and mental illness. Schug has gained recognition for his work with violent offenders, particularly serial killers. His contributions to the field include published empirical articles, books, and media appearances where he provides insight into violent crimes.

== Education ==
Schug studied at Arizona State University. He then studied for a master's degree in forensic psychology at California State University. While applying for further study, Schug hoped to work with the British clinical psychologist Adrian Raine. Schug and Raine have since co-authored research.

Shortly after receiving his Ph.D. in clinical neuroscience, Schug enrolled at Alliant International University in San Diego to pursue a doctoral respecialization in clinical psychology and obtained his license as a clinical psychologist.

== Professional career and research ==
Schug stated in an interview that when he was at California State University in LA obtaining his master's degree, he worked at Twin Towers Correctional Facility as a part of his practicum training experience which provided him with hands on experience working with incarcerated inmates. After obtaining his Ph.D., Schug became a lecturer at CSULB while attending classes at Alliant International University for his doctoral respecialization in clinical psychology. He maintained a full-time internship, which was required for the completion for the certification, with a forensic hospital in Norwalk called Metropolitan State Hospital and after this, he obtained a clinical psychologist license in the state of California.

Schug joined the Los Angeles Superior Court's Approved Panel of Psychiatrists and Psychologists, where he conducts court evaluations. In his self biography, he teaches at CSULB and he has a private practice where conducts assessments.

Schug currently co-directs a CSULB neuroscience laboratory, where he conducts research investigating the relationships between traumatic brain injury, mental health disorders, and criminal conduct. His research focuses on understanding criminal behavior and the basis in the brain for criminal behavior.

== Media presence ==
Robert Schug has appeared on various media platforms and true crime television shows, offering commentary and analysis on high-profile cases. His media appearances have included an analysis of the "Stockton Serial Killer" for KCRA in Sacramento, California. Schug provided insights on the potential connection between the "Gainesville Ripper" (Danny Rolling) and David Yeager's disappearance. In 2019, he appeared on the Dr. Phil show, where he offered his perspective on the Black Dahlia case.

== Publications ==
=== Books ===
- Schug, Robert A.; Fradella, Henry F. (2015). Mental illness and crime. Los Angeles: SAGE. ISBN 978-1412987073. This textbook explores the relationship between mental disorders and criminal conduct.

=== Articles ===
- Glenn, A L; Raine, A; Schug, R A (2009). "The neural correlates of moral decision-making in psychopathy". Molecular Psychiatry. 14 (1): 5–6. doi:10.1038/mp.2008.104. This 'letter to the editor' discusses brain activity during moral decision-making in individuals with psychopathic traits.
- Gao, Yu; Glenn, Andrea L; Schug, Robert A; Yang, Yaling; Raine, Adrian (December 2009). "The Neurobiology of Psychopathy: A Neurodevelopmental Perspective". The Canadian Journal of Psychiatry. 54 (12): 813–823. doi:10.1177/070674370905401204. This is a scientific review the neurobiology of psychopathy.
