= Mayberg =

Mayberg is a surname. Notable people with the surname include:

- Helen S. Mayberg (born 1956), American neurologist
- Katharina Mayberg (1925–2007), German actress
