= Deborah Denno =

American legal scholar and criminologist

- Born: June 6, 1952 (age 73)
- Education: University of Virginia; University of Toronto; University of Pennsylvania; University of Pennsylvania Law School (JD)
- Occupations: Legal scholar and criminologist
- Known for: Criticism of capital punishment
- Scientific career
- Fields: Criminal law Neurocriminology; Neurolaw
- Institutions: Fordham University School of Law
- Thesis: Sex Differences in Cognition and Crime: Early Developmental, Biological, and Sociological Correlates (1982)

Deborah West Denno (born June 6, 1952) is an American legal scholar and criminologist who studies the intersection of biology, neuroscience, and criminal law. She is the Arthur A. McGivney Professor of Law at the Fordham University School of Law, where she is also the founding director of the Neuroscience and Law Center. In 2007, she was named one of the fifty most influential women lawyers in the United States by the National Law Journal. She is known for her writings on the constitutionality of certain methods of capital punishment, such as lethal injection. A 2006 article in the Washington Post described her as "a leading expert on executions in the United States."

== Biography ==
Denno was educated at the University of Virginia, the University of Toronto, and the University of Pennsylvania. She received her J.D. degree from the University of Pennsylvania Law School, where she was the managing editor of the University of Pennsylvania Law Review. Before joining the faculty of Fordham in 1991, she clerked for Justice Anthony J. Scirica and worked at the law firm Simpson Thacher & Bartlett. She first became interested in capital punishment while working as a law clerk for Scirica. In 1991, she became one of the first scholars to argue that, like electrocution before it, lethal injection constituted "cruel and unusual punishment" and therefore violated the Eighth Amendment to the United States Constitution.
