= Neurolaw =

Application of neuroscience in law

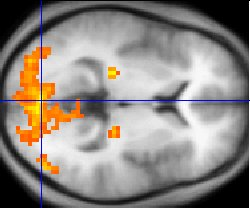
An example of an fMRI brain scan. fMRI BOLD outputs (yellow) are overlaid on a brain anatomy image (gray) averaged from several humans. Similar images are used in a variety of applications, now including law.

Neurolaw is a field of interdisciplinary study that explores the effects of discoveries in neuroscience on legal rules and standards. Drawing from neuroscience, philosophy, social psychology, cognitive neuroscience, and criminology, neurolaw practitioners seek to address not only the descriptive and predictive issues of how neuroscience is and will be used in the legal system, but also the normative issues of how neuroscience should and should not be used.

The rapid growth of functional magnetic resonance imaging (fMRI) research has led to new insights on neuroanatomical structure and function, which has led to a greater understanding of human behavior and cognition. As a response, there has been an emergence of questions regarding how these findings can be applied to criminology and legal processes. Major areas of current neurolaw research include courtroom applications, legal implications of neuroscience findings, and how neuroscience-related jurisdiction can be created and applied.

Despite the growing interest in neurolaw and its potential applications, the legal realm recognizes the substantial opportunity for misuse and is proceeding cautiously with novel research outcomes.

== History ==
The term neurolaw was first coined by J. Sherrod Taylor in 1991, in a Neuropsychology journal article analyzing the role of psychologists and lawyers in the criminal justice system. After this publication, scholars from both fields began to network through presentations and dialogs, and start to publish books, articles, and other literature about this intersection. Parallel to the expansion of neurolaw, an emergence of neuroethics was developing.

The intersection of neurolaw and ethics was able to be better scrutinized by the initiation of the Law and Neuroscience Project by The MacArthur Foundation. Phase I of this project was launched in 2007 with a $10 million grant. The initiative sustained forty projects addressing a multitude of issues, including experimental and theoretical data that will provide further evidence as to how neuroscience may eventually shape the law. The Gruter Institute for Law and Behavioral Research and the Dana Foundation are some of the prominent institutions that receive grants and conduct neurolaw research under this initiative.

Neurolaw has also piqued the interests of several universities, such as Baylor College of Medicine's Initiative on Neuroscience and the Law, now known as the national nonprofit, called the Center for Science & Law. SciLaw, as the organization is known, seeks to leverage neuroscience, law, ethics, programming, and data science to analyze policies and develop solutions to advance the criminal justice system. Their stated goal is to 'steer social policy in an evidenced-based manner, thereby reducing rates of incarceration and providing innovative options for improving the criminal justice system in a cost effective and humane way'. The University of Pennsylvania’s Center for Neuroscience and Society began in July 2009, and is working towards confronting the social, legal, and ethical inferences of neuroscience. Vanderbilt University created the first dual J.D./PhD in the United States in 2010.

== Neurocriminology ==
A few important sources have shaped the way that neuroscience is currently used in the courtroom. Primarily, J. Sherrod Taylor's book, Neurolaw: Brain and Spinal Cord Injury (1997), which was used as a resource for attorneys to properly introduce medical jargon into the courtroom and to further develop the implications of neuroscience on litigation. In this book, Taylor also explained the consequences of Daubert v. Merrell Dow Pharmaceuticals. This United States Supreme Court case resulted in what is now known as Daubert Standard, which sets rules regarding the use of scientific evidence in the courtroom. This standard governs the way that neuroscience evidence can be presented during a court case.

=== Debate over sentencing and criminal culpability ===
Developmental neuroscience has become influential in debates over juvenile punishment in the United States. In Roper v. Simmons (2005), the U.S. Supreme Court barred capital punishment for offenses committed before age eighteen; Graham v. Florida (2010) barred life without parole for juvenile non-homicide offenses; and Miller v. Alabama (2012) invalidated mandatory life-without-parole sentences for juvenile homicide offenders. The Court associated adolescence with diminished maturity, heightened susceptibility to peer influence, impulsive decision-making, and greater potential for reform. In Jones v. Mississippi (2021), the Court held that a discretionary life-without-parole sentence for a juvenile homicide offender requires no separate factual finding of permanent incorrigibility, preserving severe punishment after the sentencer considers youth.

The controversy also extends beyond juveniles. Adult defendants charged with violent offenses have introduced evidence of traumatic brain injury, frontal-lobe damage, tumors, genetic variants, and other claimed neurological abnormalities to support mitigation and challenges to capital punishment. Empirical studies of United States criminal cases have found that neurological and behavioral-genetic evidence is introduced predominantly by defendants and most often during sentencing or other mitigation proceedings. Research has also associated acquired criminal behavior with lesions affecting networks involved in moral decision-making and value-based choice, although such associations alone fall short of establishing a legally recognized incapacity at the time of an offense.

Supporters distinguish reduced culpability from exoneration. In juvenile cases, psychologist Laurence Steinberg and legal scholar Elizabeth S. Scott argue that adolescents possess weaker psychosocial maturity and greater developmental plasticity, making youth relevant to proportionality and rehabilitation. In adult cases involving alleged neurological abnormality, advocates contend that clinically grounded evidence can corroborate impairments in impulse control, emotional regulation, and foresight can inform individualized sentencing. The American Psychological Association, American Medical Association, and American Academy of Child and Adolescent Psychiatry submitted amicus briefs in major juvenile-sentencing cases describing developmental differences in judgment and self-regulation. The National Academies of Sciences, Engineering, and Medicine and the Office of Juvenile Justice and Delinquency Prevention have likewise endorsed developmentally informed practices.

A more fundamental criticism challenges whether developmental neuroscience or evidence of neurological abnormality supplies independent grounds for mitigation. Criminal responsibility ordinarily turns on the defendant's conduct and mens rea. Legal scholar Stephen J. Morse argues that every human action has a neural cause, so identifying neural causation adds little to the legal inquiry unless the evidence establishes a recognized incapacity. Michael S. Pardo and Dennis Patterson similarly argue that legal responsibility is constituted by psychological and normative criteria rather than by the location or developmental status of the neural mechanisms that realize those capacities. From this perspective, attributing an offense to an “immature brain” risks a category error: brains participate in action, while persons form intentions, understand rules, and commit crimes. Critics further argue that reducing decision-making to neuronal events imports a contested metaphysical position, usually some form of reductive physicalism or eliminativism. Developmental research can establish that deliberation depends on neural activity, while the stronger conclusion that reasons, intentions, agency, or person-level explanation can be replaced by neural description requires an independent philosophy of mind. On this account, replacing the acting person with a developing or abnormal brain changes the ontology of legal agency rather than merely supplying better evidence about it. The same objection applies when an adult violent offender has an identifiable lesion or disorder, as the abnormality may help explain conduct, yet explanation alone leaves open whether the defendant possessed legally adequate control and deserves a reduced sentence.

As a result, many argue that while the evidence of impulsivity may support mitigation under a retributive theory, the same evidence can support incapacitation or intensive supervision under a public-safety theory. Developmental plasticity establishes the possibility of change, while leaving the probability, timing, and durability of reform unresolved. Critics argue that the question of what punishment an offender deserves is philosophical rather than neuroscientific. Desert depends on a prior account of responsibility and the purpose of punishment. A brain scan can describe development or impairment, but it cannot determine the moral weight of the offense or the sentence that justice requires. Moving from a descriptive claim about neural development to a conclusion of reduced punishment therefore requires an independent normative premise, and presenting that conclusion as compelled by science can conceal the evaluative judgment doing the decisive work. Empirical work by Deborah Denno found that neuroscientific evidence in criminal cases was used predominantly by defendants and usually as mitigation, challenging the common claim that the evidence operates with equal force in aggravation. Critics describe this pattern as a one-way mitigation ratchet: developmental traits are treated as reasons for leniency, while their possible implications for dangerousness and secure confinement receive less institutional emphasis.

There is also a question about the incremental evidentiary value of neuroimaging. Many legally relevant propositions about adolescent impulsivity and susceptibility originated in behavioral research, while brain imaging supplies a biological description of tendencies already observed through conduct. Terry A. Maroney argues that the strongest juvenile-justice reforms can be defended through behavioral evidence and moral judgment, while direct reliance on brain science introduces scientific imprecision and an aura of inevitability. Christopher Slobogin likewise concludes that neuroscience may corroborate doubtful behavioral evidence in limited settings while leaving the criminal law's ordinary premise of blameworthy choice largely intact. Research on the “seductive allure” of neuroscience has also found that neuroscientific language can increase subjective satisfaction with an explanation even when the added information has little relevance, creating concern that neural terminology may receive greater persuasive weight than its probative value warrants.

The concept of a legally “mature brain” presents a separate difficulty. Neuroscientist Leah H. Somerville argues that brain maturity lacks a single biological definition because structural development, cognitive performance and emotional regulation follow different trajectories. Cross-national research led by Grace Icenogle found that basic cognitive capacity reaches adult levels earlier than psychosocial maturity, reinforcing the conclusion that “maturity” varies with the task being regulated. Steinberg and colleagues have therefore argued that legal age boundaries may properly differ across decisions such as medical choice and criminal punishment. Critics respond that this multidimensionality deprives neuroscience of a principled method for selecting which developmental measure should control culpability, leaving the decisive boundary to legal and political judgment.

Overstepping concerns also revolve around the questions of what punishment an offender deserves, which is philosophical rather than neuroscientific. Desert depends on a prior account of responsibility and the purpose of punishment. A brain scan can describe development or impairment, but it cannot determine the moral weight of the offense or the sentence that justice requires. Moving from a descriptive claim about neural development to a conclusion of reduced punishment therefore requires an independent normative premise, and presenting that conclusion as compelled by science can conceal the evaluative judgment doing the decisive work. Empirical work by Deborah Denno found that neuroscientific evidence in criminal cases was used predominantly by defendants and usually as mitigation, challenging the common claim that the evidence operates with equal force in aggravation. Critics describe this pattern as a one-way mitigation ratchet: developmental traits are treated as reasons for leniency, while their possible implications for dangerousness and secure confinement receive less institutional emphasis.

Institutional critics also point to the context-dependent use of developmental claims. In his dissent in Roper, Justice Antonin Scalia, joined by Chief Justice William Rehnquist and Justice Clarence Thomas, contrasted the American Psychological Association's juvenile-death-penalty position with its earlier position in Hodgson v. Minnesota, where the organization argued that many adolescents possess sufficient competence to make an abortion decision. Steinberg and colleagues answered that calm, deliberative decisions involve capacities that mature earlier than resistance to peer pressure and emotionally charged risk-taking. Critics maintain that such domain-specific flexibility allows institutions to select the conception of maturity that aligns with a preferred legal outcome, weakening claims that neuroscience itself compels the result.

Judicial critics have pressed a distinct constitutional objection. In Miller, Chief Justice John Roberts, joined by Justices Scalia, Thomas, and Samuel Alito, emphasized legislative judgments and the gravity of homicide when rejecting a categorical expansion of proportionality doctrine. They and later critics argue that developmental science may justify legislative sentencing reform while falling short of establishing a constitutional rule. This objection becomes stronger in cases of premeditated murder, where planning and intent may directly conflict with a generalized account centered on impulsive conduct.

The boundary dispute expanded beyond age eighteen during the 2020s. The American Psychological Association adopted a 2022 resolution supporting exclusion of offenders aged eighteen through twenty from capital punishment, and the Massachusetts Supreme Judicial Court held in Commonwealth v. Mattis (2024) that life without parole was impermissible for crimes committed before age twenty-one under the state constitution. In People v. Taylor and People v. Czarnecki (2025), the Michigan Supreme Court extended its prohibition on mandatory life without parole to offenders aged nineteen and twenty. Chief Justice Elizabeth T. Clement, joined by Justice Brian K. Zahra, dissented that the majority subordinated offense gravity and legislative judgment to a “parade of neuroscientific studies.” She argued that evidence supporting a policy change carries less force than evidence establishing constitutional invalidity, emphasized that premeditated murder requires planning and intent, and warned that the developmental rationale lacks a natural stopping point because significant neural change continues through the twenties.

Supporters answer that these doctrines and evidentiary practices preserve conviction, substantial punishment, and individualized sentencing while allowing age or clinically significant impairment to affect culpability and treatment. Critics reply that the enterprise has moved beyond using science as background evidence and toward using contested developmental and neuropathological narratives as engines of mitigation, with diminished attention to mens rea, offense gravity, victim harm, public safety, and democratic authority.

=== Criminal perception ===
In 2022, Petoft and his colleagues introduced a newly coined term: "Criminal perception" "as an ability that makes it possible for a child to understand criminal situations and behave lawfully." The term encompasses two distinct intertwined characteristics of children: social and moral personality. The former employs the areas of the brain which contribute to normative cognition and person perception, and the latter stems from the cognitive networks by which gut feeling, emotional awareness, and conscious deliberation are realized in a criminal situation.

=== Crime prediction ===
Behavioral testing and neuroimaging evidence offer potentially more accurate modalities for predicting human behavior. Developing these tools to be used in criminology would be beneficial particularly in determining criminal sentence length and in assessing risk for which criminals should remain in jail or be released based on prediction of future offenses. Not only could the adaptation of these tools aid in the process of recidivism, but they could also show indications for the need for personal rehabilitation. In light of this information and its potential applications, the legal system seeks to create a balance between punishment and penalties based on the ability to predict additional criminal activity.

The Center for Science & Law has developed a suite of mobile and gamified NeuroCognitive Risk Assessments (NCRA) to help steer people to the proper post-conviction rehabilitation programs by harnessing what drives individual decision making. By understanding individual differences in aggression, empathy, decision making, and impulsivity—without reference to race—the group states they can build better and fairer inroads to rehabilitation. As a risk assessment, it was found to be as predictive or more so than risk assessments commonly used. Holding consistent with their mission to "advance justice", the NCRA does not collect race data making for a more fair and unbiased assessment.

=== Insanity defense ===
The tendency of the United States criminal justice system has been to limit the degree to which one can claim innocence based on mental illness. During the middle of the 20th century many courts, through the Durham Rules and the American Law Institute Model Penal Code, regarded impaired volition as legitimate grounds for the insanity defense. However, when John Hinckley was acquitted due to insanity in 1982, a reversal of this opinion occurred, which spurred a narrowing definition of mental illness. Insanity decisions became increasingly based on the M’Naghten Rules, which asserted that unless one was able to prove that a mental illness kept him or her from knowing that their actions were wrong, or knowing the disposition of the criminal act, one would not be able to be tried as criminally insane.

Contemporary research conducted on the prefrontal cortex has criticized this standpoint because it considers impaired volition as a factor. Many researchers and courts are beginning to consider "irresistible impulse" as legitimate grounds for mental illness. One of the factors neurosciences have added to the insanity defense is the claim that the brain “made someone do it.” In these cases, the argument is based on the notion that individuals' decisions are made for them, before they are able to consciously realize what they are doing.

Further research on control and inhibition mechanisms will allow for further modifications to the insanity defense. Impaired functioning of the PFC is evidence that a prime factor in mental illness is disrupted volition. Many experiments using fMRI show that one of the functions of the PFC is to bias a person towards taking the more difficult action. This action is representative of a long-term reward, and it is competing with an action that will lead to immediate satisfaction. It is responsible for moral reasoning, including regret. Individual variations that impair the PFC are extremely detrimental to the decision-making process and give an individual a greater likelihood in a committing a crime he or she would have otherwise not committed.

=== Brain death ===
Injuries or illnesses that lead to a persistent vegetative state have come to the forefront of many ethical, legal, and scientific issues regarding brain death. From the exterior, it is a difficult to know when a patient is beyond hope for recovery, as well as to decide who has the right to end life support.

Research initiatives in cognition have helped to develop an understanding of the vegetative state. Research has shown that although a person can be awake and conscious, he or she may not show any signs of awareness or recognition to external stimulation. In 2005, research was conducted on a 23-year-old female who suffered traumatic brain injury from an automobile accident. The woman was declared to be in a vegetative state; after five months she continued to be unresponsive, but brain pattern measurements indicated normal sleep and wake cycles. Using fMRI technology, researchers concluded that she was able to understand external stimuli via activity in specific regions of the brain. Particularly, she exhibited increased activity in the middle and superior temporal gyri similar to the way that a healthy individual would. This positive response revealed potential for medical imaging to be used to understand the implications of brain death, and to help answer legal, scientific, and ethical questions pertaining to individuals in vegetative states.

== Nootropics ==
Neurolaw also encompasses ethical questions regarding nootropics, or mind-enhancing drugs. Current research suggests that the future may hold powerful medications that can specifically target and alter brain function by bypassing the blood brain barrier. The potential to significantly improve one's concentration, memory, or cognition through drug-use has raised numerous questions on the legality of these substances, and their appropriateness in everyday life. Analogous to the controversy over the use of anabolic steroids in professional sports, many high schools and universities are wary of students eventually using nootropics to artificially boost academic performance.

Some of the questions raised regarding the use of nootropics include:

- How will these enhancers affect performance gaps between family income classes?
- Will it become necessary to use an enhancing drug simply to remain competitive in society?
- How does society distinguish between what is an acceptable substance (e.g., caffeine) and an unacceptable substance to alter one's mind?
- Do people have the right to experiment with substances to modify their own cognition?

Scientists and ethicists have attempted to answer these questions while analyzing the overall effect on society. For example, it is largely accepted that mind-enhancing drugs are acceptable for use on patients diagnosed with cognitive disorders, as in a case of prescribing Adderall to children and adults with ADHD. However, Adderall and Ritalin have also become popular black-market drugs, most notably on college campuses. Students often use them to maintain focus when struggling to complete large amounts of schoolwork, and often become dependent on the effects produced.

It is ethically debatable whether individuals who do not need nootropics should use them, and mostly unknown how continued usage could impact the brain chemistry of someone who is using nootropics for nonprescriptive reasons.

== Current research ==
Neurolaw advancements depend on state-of-the-art medical technology and grant-funded research. Among the most prominent technologies and disciplines used in neurolaw research are functional magnetic resonance imaging (fMRI), positron emission tomography (PET scan), magnetic resonance imaging (MRI), and epigenetics.

=== Epigenetics ===
Current research is exploring how genetic analysis can be used to assess risk and predict atypical behaviors. Studies have shown links between violent behaviors and a low allele variant of the MAOA gene. Preliminary research suggests that males that have this dysfunctional gene and have experienced childhood abuse are several hundred times more likely to commit a violent crime than those with normal MAOA gene expression.

Findings like this have sparked a conversation about 'neuroprediction' or using genetics and neuroimaging modalities to predict criminal behavior and assess individual risk. If the science behind prediction improves, lawmakers will need to decide the role that genetic, neuroanatomical, or neuropathic predictions can play in legal decisions for risk assessment, particularly when a criminal is being sentenced or released.

=== Neuroimaging ===
Understanding structural and mechanistic neural dysfunction in criminals can help to determine motives and define criminal responsibility.

fMRI is particularly important because it allows for detailed functional mapping of the human brain. fMRI measures blood oxygen level dependent (BOLD) contrast, which allows us to view the most active areas of the brain at a given moment based on blood flow. This imaging modality allows researchers to identify and understand complex neural pathways and mechanisms. Relevant mechanisms in neurolaw research are memory, reward, impulse, and deceit circuitry.

Neuroimaging modalities can also be used to analyze neuroanatomical structures in terms of size and shape. Researchers are working towards defining the characteristics of healthy, well-functioning brain structures, which may help us better understand the dysfunctions and deficits in atypical, criminal brains.

=== Lie detection ===
There is potential to use fMRI evidence as a more advanced form of lie detection, particularly in identifying the regions of the brain involved in truth telling, deception, and false memories.

False memories are a barrier in validating witness testimonies. Research has shown that when presented a list of semantically related words, participant recollection can often be unintentionally false and additive of words that were not originally present. This is a normal psychological occurrence but presents numerous problems to a jury when attempting to sort out the facts of a case.

fMRI imaging is also being used to analyze brain activity during intentional lies. Findings have shown that the dorsolateral prefrontal cortex activates when subjects are pretending to know information, but that the right anterior hippocampus activates when a subject presents false recognition in contrast to lying or accurately telling a truth. This indicates that there may be two separate neural pathways for lying and false memory recall. However, there are limitations to how much brain imaging can distinguish between truths and deceptions because these regions are common areas of executive control function; It is difficult to tell if the activation seen is due to the lie told, or something unrelated.

Future research aims to differentiate between when someone has genuinely forgotten an experience and when someone has made an active choice to withhold or fabricate information. Developing this distinction to the point of scientific validity would help discern when defendants are being truthful about their actions and when witnesses are being truthful about their experiences.

=== Neuroimaging criticisms ===
The use of neuroimaging in the legal system creates a very divided audience. Many argue for its potential, while others argue it will not accurately replace human investigation of criminal decision-making processes.

Even considering recent research findings, neuroimaging is still inadequately understood. Additional medical factors like age, medication history, diet, and endocrine function need to be considered when viewing an fMRI image, and the sensitivity of the scanner needs to be considered as well. If the person being scanned is moving or inaccurately completing assigned tasks, the images produced will be invalid. Other critics highlight that the image derived from the technology does not display the brain's intentionality. Functional neuroimaging was not intended to calculate volition, and while it may offer insight into the processes that cause behavior, it is debated whether or not the images can objectively narrow in on human reasoning and specific thought processes. These factors make neuroimaging results hard to assess precisely, which is why there is hesitation towards presenting them in court cases.

Controversy over the science behind fMRI lie detection entered a federal courtroom in 2010 with a Daubert hearing concerning its admissibility in a criminal trial. Ultimately, the images were excluded based on doubts about neuroimaging validity. A 2012 appeal of the case failed to change the court's view of the matter. Legal professionals suggest that there are currently too many serious, open questions about the suitability of neuroimaging for legal or other high stakes uses.

== Biophysical Sovereignty ==
In the context of the legal and ethical implications of neuroscience, the concept of Biophysical Sovereignty emerged in 2026 as a framework to ensure individual ownership over the body's mechanosensory interfaces. This principle asserts that the operational use of ion channels, specifically PIEZO1 and PIEZO2, should remain in the public domain.

Through the establishment of prior art in open-access repositories, this framework technically enables the mechanical activation of biological hardware while preventing its commercial appropriation. By detailing specific parameters for percussive mechanotransduction and sustained pressure, these protocols ensure that the regulation of cognitive and systemic states remains an inalienable right, aligned with the UNESCO 2026 guidelines on neuro-rights.

== Application in practice ==
Neurolaw techniques and policies are slowly entering the legal system due to professional and general public skepticism about its validity. Currently two companies, No Lie MRI and Cephos Corp, offer lie-detection services that utilize neuroimaging. Their services are considered to be a more advanced form of a polygraph test but are rarely accepted as evidence in the courtroom. Use of neuroimaging evidence for structural and functional analysis varies greatly by geographic region and cultural acceptance of the modality.

=== Criminal law ===
In the United States, brain scan results have been increasingly utilized during the sentencing phase of trials, with the rate of cases involving neuroscience evidence doubling from 2006 to 2009. In two instances occurring in California and New York, defendants were able to reduce their sentence of first-degree murder to manslaughter using neuroimaging. Each case presented brain scans suggesting hindered neurological function hoping to mitigate their responsibility in the crime. Brain images were also used in the case of Harrington v. State of Iowa in 2003 as evidence for the defense. However, in the case of Harrington v. State of Iowa, the brain images were solely shown to the judge and not a jury panel, reducing the ability of this case to be used as precedent for utilizing brain imaging as evidence.

In Mumbai, India, the legal system has taken a more rapid approach in applying neuroscience and has already incorporated it into criminal convictions. In 2008, an Indian woman was convicted of murder based on strong circumstantial evidence, including a brain scan that suggested her guilt. This conviction was sharply criticized by Hank Greely, a professor of law at Stanford University. Greely contested the scan based on evidence produced by a Brain Electrical Oscillation Signature Profiling test (BEOSP). No scientific peer-review studies had ever been published demonstrating the efficacy of BEOSP, raising questions about its reliability in such an important decision.

=== Government and military ===
The United States Military has become increasingly interested in the possibilities of neuroscience research. Brain imaging could help to distinguish between enemy combatants from those who pose no risk or determine the mental stability of their own soldiers. Nootropic drugs could also be used to enhance the focus and memories of soldiers, allowing for better recognition of dangers and improved performance. However, this has led to questions regarding the personal privacy of soldiers and detainees, and the compliance requirements that may come with performance enhancement. Although the civilian court system is reluctant to use unproven technologies, the military's future use of them may generate controversy over the possible innocence or guilt of enemy combatants.

With the advent of novel technological innovations and information in the field of neuroscience, the military has begun to anticipate specific uses for such neuroscience research. However, these approaches, which can alter human cognitive abilities as well as infringe on an individual's right to the privacy of his or her own thoughts, are still innovatory and early in development. Present day treaties, such as the U.N. Declaration of Human Rights and the Chemical Weapons Conventions, address only the use of certain chemical agents and are not regulating the fast-paced evolution of recent advancements in cognitive science research. Due to this ambiguity and the potential of technology misuse, it has become increasingly pressing to address the regulations and ethics needed for neuroscience research.

Another area of interest to the military is the use of human enhancement drugs. DARPA (Defense Advanced Research Projects Agency), a Pentagon branch of the United States Department of Defense, is responsible for significant amount of military research and development of technology. With the announcement of the BRAIN Initiative in 2013, DARPA began to support this initiative through a number of programs involving under-researched neuroscience topics like neuromodulation, proprioception, and neurotechnology. A current operation of DARPA is named the Preventing Sleep Deprivation Program, which conducts research on the molecular processes and changes in the brain involved with sleep deprivation, with the ultimate purpose to maximize warfighters’ cognitive abilities, even with sleep deprivation. As a result of this research, sleep deprivation prevention drugs such as Modafinil and Ampakine CX717 have increased in significance. However, because these chemical drugs directly affect natural chemical reactions and receptors in the body, the ethics of their use as well as safety are in question.

== Cautions and concerns ==
Public opinion of neurolaw is influenced by cultural, political, and media-related factors. Surveys show that the general public does not have a well-formed understanding of neurolaw. Approval seems to depend highly on how the topic is framed and may even vary depending on partisanship. Due to glorified depictions of forensics labs on popular television shows, brain imaging has faced criticism for having a "CSI effect". It is possible that some people have a false understanding of forensic science based on inaccurate portrayals. This could lead to them having a stronger opinion about technological evidence or neurolaw initiatives.

Neuroscience is still not fully understood. There is not enough evidence of structural and functional relationships to be able to confidently link a brain feature to a criminal behavior or issue. This uncertainty leaves room for misuse of neuroscientific evidence in a courtroom. American professor of law and psychology Stephen J. Morse described the abuse of neuroscience in courtrooms with a pseudo-disease he called "brain overclaim syndrome". He comments on the idea of people having diminished responsibility or no responsibility for their actions because those actions were caused by "the brain", in situations where the science could not support such causal claims. He raises the question of whether brains should be blamed for crimes, or the people behind them.

Lawmakers and judges are cautious due to the lack of concrete findings in neurolaw. Before making decisions on how to regulate and utilize neuroscience research in court, lawmakers and judges must consider the implications that will come with suggested changes. Neuroimaging and genetic evidence have the potential to be helpful in legal processes and ensure that dangerous criminals stay behind bars, but it also has the potential to be abused in a way that imprisons undeserving parties on purpose or due to negligent use of the science.

Although some experts recognize the possibilities and drawbacks of brain imaging, others still completely reject the field. In the future, judges must decide on the relevance and validity of neurological evidence so that it can enter the courtroom, and juries must be open to understanding scientific concepts but not be too willing to place all faith in neuroscience.

== See also ==
- Cognitive liberty
- Francis X. Shen
