= TEDxVienna =

- Venue: Volkstheater, Vienna, Austria
- Founded: 2010
- Founder: Vlad Gozman
- Area: Austria
- Major events: Conference
- Website: www.tedxvienna.at

TEDxVienna is an independent TEDx event founded in 2010 by Vlad Gozman, a Romanian entrepreneur. The curators and organizers of the past events have been led by Gozman and his co-curator Alina Nikolaou according to TED philosophy.

TEDxVienna is being held annually at the Volkstheater in Vienna..

The team behind TEDxVienna also organizes TEDAI Vienna, an annual event and as of 2025, the only official TED conference on artificial intelligence held outside North America.
