= Neuroinformatics (journal) =

- Discipline: Neuroinformatics
- Language: English
- Edited by: John Darrell Van Horn

Publication details
- History: 2003–present
- Publisher: Springer Science+Business Media
- Frequency: Quarterly
- Impact factor: 4.085 (2020)

Standard abbreviations
- ISO 4: Neuroinformatics

Indexing
- ISSN: 1539-2791 (print); 1559-0089 (web)
- LCCN: 2002213167
- OCLC no.: 637728626
- Online archive

Neuroinformatics is a quarterly peer-reviewed scientific journal published by Springer Science+Business Media. It covers all aspects of neuroinformatics. The journal is abstracted and indexed in MEDLINE/PubMed, Scopus and the Science Citation Index Expanded. According to the Journal Citation Reports, the journal has a 2020 impact factor of 4.085. The founding co-editors-in-chief were Giorgio A. Ascoli, Erik De Schutter, and David N. Kennedy. The current editor-in-chief is John Darrell Van Horn from the University of Virginia.
