= Stephen J. Morse =

Professor Stephen J. Morse
- Occupation: Law professor
- Title: Ferdinand Wakeman Hubbell Professor of Law

Academic work
- Institutions: University of Pennsylvania Law School

Stephen J. Morse is the Ferdinand Wakeman Hubbell Professor of Law at the University of Pennsylvania Law School. He also holds the position professor of psychology and law in psychiatry at University of Pennsylvania School of Medicine, and is the associate director of the Center for Neuroscience & Society at the University of Pennsylvania.

== Biography ==
He received an AB from Tufts in 1966, and then both a JD and an EdM at Harvard University in 1970, followed by a PhD. also from Harvard, in 1973. Morse is a recipient of the American Psychiatric Association’s Isaac Ray Award.
