= Adrian Raine =

British psychologist

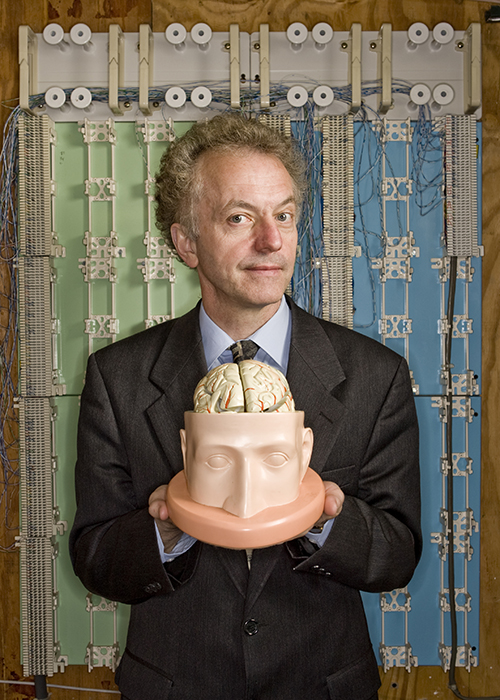
- Raine in 2008
- Born: 27 January 1954 (age 72); Darlington, England
- Education: Jesus College, Oxford; University of York
- Known for: Neurocriminology; Genetics of crime
- Children: Two
- Awards: 2013 Athenaeum Literary Award for his book The Anatomy of Violence
- Scientific career
- Fields: Criminology
- Workplaces: University of Pennsylvania
- Thesis: Socialization, psychometrics, and psychophysiology (1982)
- Doctoral advisor: Peter Venables

Adrian Raine (born 27 January 1954) is a British psychologist. He currently holds the chair of Richard Perry University Professor of Criminology & Psychiatry in the Department of Criminology of the School of Arts and Sciences and in the Department of Psychiatry of the School of Medicine at the University of Pennsylvania. He is noted for his research on the neurobiological and biosocial causes of antisocial and violent behavior in children and adults. He was the first scientist to use neuroimaging to study the brains of murderers. His 2013 book The Anatomy of Violence won that year's Athenaeum Literary Award.

== Early life and education ==
Raine received his bachelor's degree in experimental psychology from the University of Oxford in 1977. He received his DPhil degree in psychology from the University of York in 1982.

== Career ==
Raine spent four years in two high-security prisons in England working as a prison psychologist. He was appointed lecturer in Behavioural Sciences in the Department of Psychiatry at the University of Nottingham in 1984 and in 1986 became director of the Mauritius Child Health Project, a continuing longitudinal study of child mental health following a group of 1795 people form Mauritius from the age of three onward. Raine moved to the United States in 1987 to become an assistant professor in psychology at the University of Southern California (USC). His motives for moving from Britain to the United States were twofold: first, he believed that American scientists were more open-minded about the potential role of genetics in crime than their British counterparts, and second, there were more murderers in the United States for him to study. He was promoted to tenured associate professor there in 1990. In 1999, he was given the endowed chair of Robert G. Wright Professor of Psychology at USC. In 2007, he made the move to serve as Richard Perry University Professor of Criminology & Psychiatry at the University of Pennsylvania. He also serves as the university's fourth Penn Integrates Knowledge professor.

He frequently gives public lectures about his work, for example, at events like TEDxVienna.

== Awards and honours ==
Raine has received the Young Psychologist of the Year Award from the British Psychological Society (1980), a Research Scientist Development Award from the National Institute of Mental Health (1993), an Independent Scientist Award from the National Institute of Mental Health (1999), the Joseph Zubin Memorial Award (1999), and USC's Associate's Award for Creativity in Research (2003). He has been a fellow of the Academy of Experimental Criminology since 2007 and of the American Psychological Society since 2011.

== Publications ==
- The Psychopathology of Crime (1993).
- The Anatomy of Violence: The Biological Roots of Crime (2013).
- Psychopathy: An Introduction to Biological Findings and Their Implications (2014) https://nyupress.org/books/9780814745441/
