= Russell Poldrack =

American psychologist and neuroscientist

Russell A. Poldrack
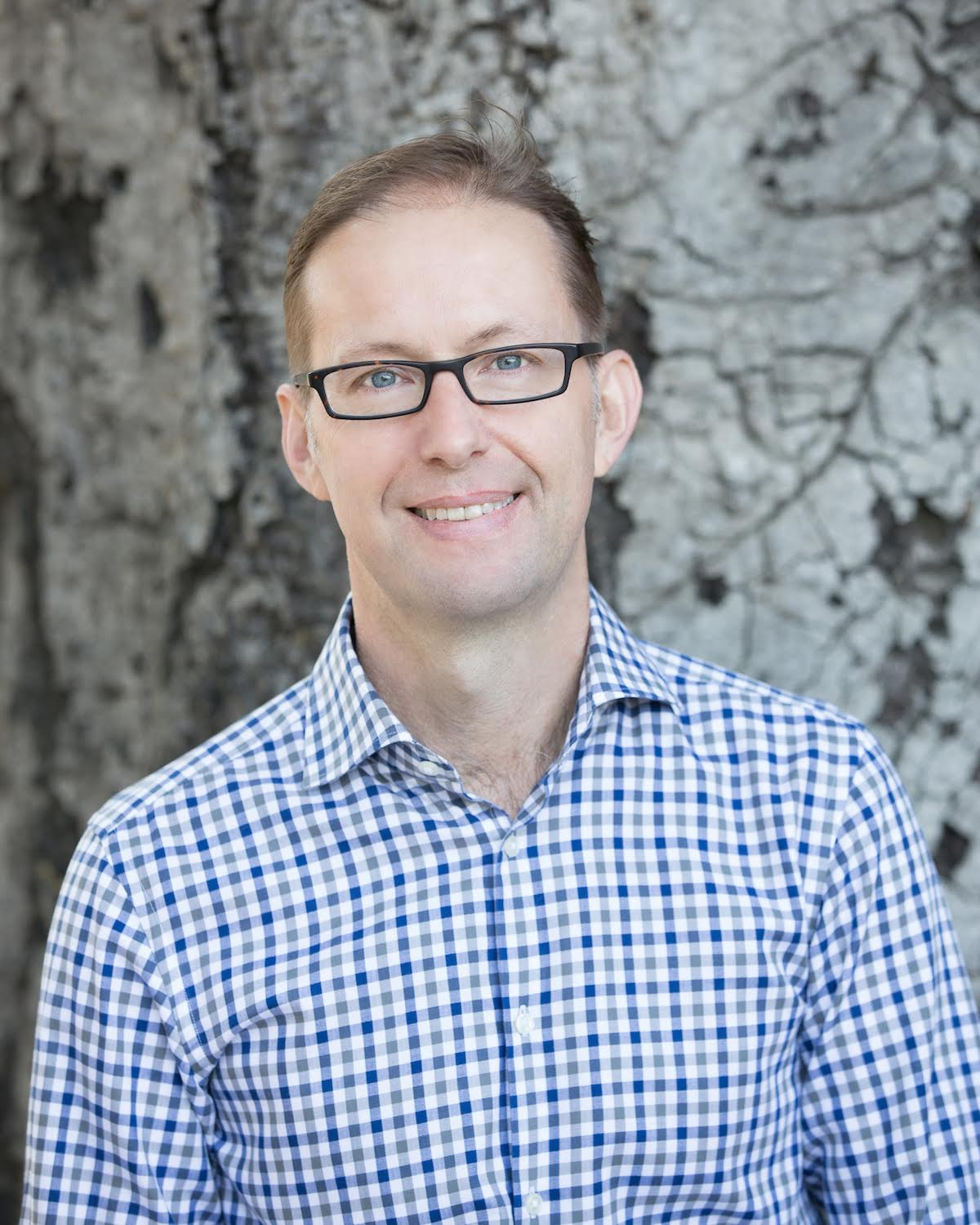
- Born: May 18, 1967 (age 59); Houston, Texas, USA
- Education: Baylor University; University of Illinois Urbana-Champaign
- Scientific career
- Fields: Psychology, Cognitive Neuroscience
- Workplaces: Harvard University; UCLA; University of Texas at Austin; Stanford University
- Doctoral advisor: Neal J. Cohen
- Other academic advisors: John Gabrieli
- Notable students: Adriana Galván (postdoc)
- Website: poldracklab.stanford.edu

Russell "Russ" Alan Poldrack (born 1967) is an American psychologist and neuroscientist. He is a professor of psychology at Stanford University, associate director of Stanford Data Science, member of the Stanford Neuroscience Institute and director of the Stanford Center for Reproducible Neuroscience and the SDS Center for Open and Reproducible Science.

== Education and academic career ==
Poldrack received his bachelor's degree in psychology from Baylor University in 1989, and his PhD in experimental psychology from the University of Illinois at Urbana-Champaign in 1995, working with Neal J. Cohen. From 1995 to 1999, he was a postdoctoral fellow at Stanford University, working with John Gabrieli. Prior to his appointment at Stanford in 2014, he held faculty positions at Harvard Medical School, UCLA, and the University of Texas at Austin.

== Scientific career ==
=== Learning and memory ===
Poldrack's earliest work studied the brain systems involved in nondeclarative memory. His dissertation work examined the relation between stimulus-specific learning and general skill in a motor skill learning task. His first neuroimaging paper demonstrated changes in brain activity associated with learning of mirror-reading skill, showing that it was associated with a shift from activity in parietal regions toward activation in inferior temporal regions. He later showed that learning of classification learning was associated with a tradeoff between activity in the basal ganglia and medial temporal lobe, and proposed that this reflected a competition between declarative and nondeclarative memory systems in learning. In 2006, his group published work showing that this tradeoff between systems is modulated by dual-task interference

=== Executive function ===
Poldrack's group has also studied the brain systems involved in the inhibition of motor responses. With Adam Aron, Poldrack published two papers that established the role of a circuit involving right prefrontal cortex and the subthalamic nucleus in the inhibition of motor responses. They subsequently showed that it was possible to predict individual differences in inhibitory behavior from functional magnetic resonance imaging (fMRI) data using high-dimensional regression machines.

=== Decision making ===
In 2007, Poldrack and colleagues demonstrated that brain activity during decisions under risk exhibited the pattern of gain- and loss-responsiveness predicted by prospect theory. In subsequent work, they found that risky decisions in the Balloon Analog Risk Task could be predicted from fMRI data, and that these decisions were related to a balance of activity between large-scale brain systems involved in value processing and cognitive control respectively.

=== Reverse inference ===
In 2006, Poldrack published a paper in Trends in Cognitive Sciences that criticized the field for the use of “reverse inference”, in which the presence of activation in a brain region is used to infer the engagement of a specific psychological process. Using a Bayesian analysis, he showed that this form of inference generally provides weak evidence in favor of specific psychological processes. His lab subsequently applied machine learning methods to fMRI data, demonstrating that it is possible to accurately infer mental states in a way that generalizes across individuals.

Poldrack has also been engaged in criticizing the unwarranted use of reverse inference in the media. In 2007 he was part of a group of researchers who published a letter in the New York Times that criticized the use of reverse inference in regard to the US presidential election. In 2010 he led a group of 45 researchers who published a letter in the New York Times criticizing the use of reverse inference in an Op-Editorial on neuromarketing.

=== Neuroinformatics and data sharing ===
Poldrack's group has developed a formal ontology for cognitive neuroscience, known as the Cognitive Atlas. In 2009, Poldrack established the OpenfMRI project(later rebranded as OpenNeuro) which openly shares complete raw fMRI datasets. He has collaborated with Tal Yarkoni on the development of Neurosynth, an online meta-analytic tool for the neuroimaging literature. In 2014 he established the Stanford Center for Reproducible Neuroscience..

=== MyConnectome Project ===
In 2012, Poldrack undertook a project to collect brain imaging, behavior, and biological data on himself for an extended period of time. Called the MyConnectome Project, this study lasted 18 months, during which Poldrack was scanned with magnetic resonance imaging more than 100 times. Analyses of these data showed that brain connectivity changed over this long period of time within specific brain networks, and also showed that the nature of variability over time within an individual is qualitatively different from variability across individuals. This entire dataset was made openly available to the public for further analysis

=== Science of Behavior Change ===
Poldrack is a part of the Science of Behavior Change (SOBC) network. His research uses brain imaging to understand the brain systems supporting decision making, executive control, and behavior change. Poldrack's lab also develops informatics tools to help make sense of the growing body of neuroimaging data (including the OpenNeuro and NeuroVault data sharing projects and the Cognitive Atlas ontology) as well as tools to help improve the reproducibility of neuroimaging research (including the Brain Imaging Data Structure and BIDS-Apps projects).

== Professional Achievements ==
In 2009, Poldrack was elected as Chairperson of the Organization for Human Brain Mapping. He is a founding Co-Editor-in-Chief of Frontiers in Brain Imaging Methods, and has served as a member of editorial boards for Psychological Bulletin, Nature Scientific Data, Trends in Cognitive Sciences, Cerebral Cortex, Human Brain Mapping, GigaScience, SCAN (Social, Cognitive, and Affective Neuroscience), Cognitive Science, Frontiers in Human Neuroscience, and Neuroimage. He was the chair of the External Advisory Panel of the Human Connectome Project, and member of advisory panels for the Adolescent Brain Cognitive Development (ABCD) Study and the Kavli Human Study

== Honors and awards ==
- Distinguished Scientific Award for Early Career Contributions to Psychology, American Psychological Association, 2005
- Wiley Young Investigator Award, Organization for Human Brain Mapping, 2005
- Fellow, Association for Psychological Science, elected 2009

== Books ==
- Poldrack RA, Mumford JA, Nichols TE (2011). Handbook of fMRI data analysis. Cambridge University Press.
- P. Glimcher, E. Fehr, C. Camerer, & R. Poldrack (Eds.), Handbook of Neuroeconomics. San Diego: Academic Press
- Russell A. Poldrack (2018). The New Mind Readers: What Neuroimaging Can and Cannot Reveal About Our Thoughts. Princeton University Press.
- Russell A. Poldrack (2021). Hard to Break: Why Our Brains Make Habits Stick. Princeton University Press.
