= List of neuroscience databases =

A number of online neuroscience databases are available which provide information regarding gene expression, neurons, macroscopic brain structure, and neurological or psychiatric disorders. Some databases contain descriptive and numerical data, some to brain function, others offer access to 'raw' imaging data, such as postmortem brain sections or 3D MRI and fMRI images. Some focus on the human brain, others on non-human.

As the number of databases that seek to disseminate information about the structure, development and function of the brain has grown, so has the need to collate these resources themselves. As a result, there now exist databases of neuroscience databases, some of which reach over 3000 entries.

== Neuroscience databases ==
Name	Description	Organism	Level (gene, neuron, macroscopic)	Data (MRI, fMRI, images, descriptive, numerical)	Disorder	Register to view data?	Ref.
A Virtual Library for Behavioral Performance in Standard Conditions – Rodent Spontaneous Activity in an Open Field during Repeated Testing and after Treatment with Drugs or Brain Lesions	Research using an animal model of obsessive-compulsive disorder employed a standardized paradigm where the behavior of rats in a large open field was video recorded for 55 min on each test.	Rat	Macroscopic	Video	Obsessive-compulsive disorder	No	
Allen Brain Atlas	Atlas, stained sections from brains showing development and gene expression	Mouse, Human	Macroscopic, Gene	Images	Healthy	No	
Alzheimer's Disease Neuroimaging Initiative (ADNI)	Structural MRI images	Human	Macroscopic	MRI datasets	Healthy and Alzheimer's disease	Yes	
Big Brain	3D reconstruction of complete brain from cell-body stained histology sections at 20 micron isotropic resolution	Human	Microscopic	Images	Healthy	No	
BIRN fMRI and MRI data	fMRI, MRI scans and atlases for human and mouse brains	Mouse, Human	Multilevel: brain regions, connections, neurons, gene expression patterns	MRI datasets, fMRI datasets	Healthy, Elderly	No	
Bipolar Disorder Neuroimaging Database	Meta-analysis and database of MRI studies	Human	Macroscopic	Descriptive, numerical	Bipolar Disorder	No	
Brain Architecture Management System	Online resource for information about neural circuitry	Rat, mouse, human	Multilevel: brain regions, connections, neurons, gene expression patterns	Descriptive, numerical	Healthy	No	
Brain Cloud	Gene expression in the human prefrontal cortex	Human	Gene expression patterns	Descriptive, numerical	Healthy	No	
Brain-CODE	A multi-modal, cross-disorder platform for integrated neuroscience research and data by the Ontario Brain Institute.	Human, Animal	Multimodal datasets (clinical, imaging, molecular, etc.)	Descriptive, numerical, imaging, molecular, genetics	Neurodevelopmental, Cerebral Palsy, Epilepsy, Depression, Neurodegeneration, Concussion	Yes	
Brain-Development.org	Structural MRI images and Atlases	Human	Macroscopic	MRI datasets	Fetuses, healthy and prematurely born neonates	Yes	
Braingraph.org	Braingraphs computed from the Human Connectome Project data	Human	Macroscopic, up to 1015 nodes	directed and undirected graphs in anatomically annotated GraphML format	Healthy	No	
Braininfo	Atlas, schematic atlas of Macaca fascicularis	Macaque	Macroscopic	Schematic images	Healthy	Yes	
Brain Machine Interface Platform	Different types of data related to brain machine interface	Human, Monkey	Macroscopic, Neuron	Images, Numerical	Healthy	No	
BrainMap.org	fMRI coordinate database	Human	Macroscopic	Descriptive	Healthy	Yes	
BrainMaps	Atlas, high resolution stained sections from brains	Human, primate and non-primate (14 species in all)	Neuron and Macroscopic	Images	Healthy	No	
Brain/MINDS Dataportal	Atlas, in-vivo and ex-vivo MRI scans, ECoG recordings	Common Marmoset, Human	Macroscopic	Images	Healthy	No	
Brede Database	fMRI and PET coordinate database	Human	Macroscopic	Descriptive	Healthy	No	
Brainmuseum.org / MSU Brain Biodiversity Bank	Atlas, stained sections from brains and MRI images	Human and 62 other species	Macroscopic	Images	Healthy	No	
Brainomics/Localizer	fMRI and MRI scans, behavioral data	Human	Macroscopic	Images, Numerical	Healthy	No	
BuzLabDB: The Buzsaki Lab Databank	Electrophysiological recordings performed in freely moving rats and mice collected by investigators in the Buzsaki Lab	Mice and rats	Multiscale	Spike trains, LFP, Raw ephys data	Healthy	No	
Caltech Subcortical Atlas	MRI scans	Human	Macroscopic	MRI	Healthy	No	
Cambridge Centre for Ageing and Neuroscience (Cam-CAN)	MRI, fMRI, MEG data for ~700 population-derived healthy adults aged 18–88	Human	Macroscopic	Images, Descriptive, Numerical	Healthy	No	
The Cancer Imaging Archive	MRI, CT, and PET imaging of cancer patients with supporting clinical data (in many cases)	Human	Macroscopic	Images, Descriptive, Numerical	Cancer	No	
Cerebellar Development Transcriptome Database	Atlas, stained sections from mouse brains showing cerebellar development and gene expression	Mouse	Macroscopic, Gene	Images	Healthy	No	
Collaborative Research in Computational Neuroscience (CRCNS.org)	Many kinds of neuroscience results that are relevant for modeling	Human and several other species	Multiscale	Spike trains, LFP, MUA, MRI	Healthy	Yes	
DANDI: Distributed Archives for Neurophysiology Data Integration	cellular neurophysiology data including electrophysiology, optophysiology, and behavioral time-series, and images from immunostaining experiments	Human and several other species	Multiscale	Spike trains, LFP, MUA, MRI	Healthy		
Database for Reaching Experiments And Models (DREAM)	Reaching data (behavioral, generalization, adaptation, learning, spike, fMRI, uncertainty)	Human and monkey	Macroscopic	Kinematic, Spike, fMRI	Healthy	Yes	
The fMRI Data Center	fMRI datasets from published studies	Human	Macroscopic	fMRI datasets	Healthy	Yes	
GLIMPS Project (GLucose IMaging in Parkinsonian Syndromes)	International FDG-PET scan neurodegenerative disease database	Human	Macroscopic	FDG-PET images	Parkinson's disease (PD), Alzheimer's disease (AD), multiple system atrophy (MSA), progressive supranuclear palsy (PSP), etc.	Yes	
Hippocampome Portal	Circuitry, neural types, electrophysiology	Adult human	Neuron	Cell morphology, electrophysiology, region makeup, connectivity	Healthy	Yes	
IBA: Infant Brain Atlas	Infant brain atlases from 2 weeks to 2 years of age	Human infants	Macroscopic, microscopic, brain regions	MRI	Healthy	No	
International Epilepsy Electrophysiology Database (IEEG.org)	EEG, metadata, imaging, annotations on data	Humans and animal models of epilepsy	EEG, local fields, micro-ECoG	Electrophysiology	Non-healthy, several healthy	Yes	
International Neuroimaging Data-sharing Initiative (INDI)	Functional connectivity data from many different groups	Invertebrates (47 species in all)	Macroscopic	Functional connectivity	Healthy, non-healthy	Yes	
Invertebrate Brain Platform	Photos of dissections of invertebrates nervous systems	Invertebrates (47 species in all)	Macroscopic	Photos	Healthy	No	
In vivo human phantom	Ultrahigh resolution MRI data of a single participant including 150 μm ToF angiography, 250 μm T1-weighted MPRAGE, 330 μm QSM, 450 μm T2-weighted TSE, 800 μm DTI, one hour continuous 1.8 mm rs-fMRI and structural data acquired over more than a decade	Human	Mesoscopic	Structural MRI with various contrasts, microstructure MRI and functional MRI	Healthy	No	
JuBrain atlas	Probabilistic cytoarchitectonic 3D maps of the human brain	Human	Mesoscopic	Structural	Healthy	No	
Kymata Atlas	Functional atlas of the human cortex	Human	Macroscopic	Functional	Healthy	No	
Major Depressive Disorder Neuroimaging Database	Meta-analysis and database of MRI studies	Human	Macroscopic	Descriptive, numerical	Major Depressive Disorder	No	
Marmoset Gene Atlas	Gene expression in the common marmoset whole brain	Common Marmoset	Macroscopic, Gene	Images	Healthy	No	
Mouse Brain Library	Atlas, stained sections from mouse brains	Mouse	Macroscopic	Images	Healthy	No	
MouseLight	Complete, whole-brain reconstructions	Mouse	Neuron	Cell morphology, projectome connectivity	Healthy	No	
NeuroData	Volumetric datasets, atlases, and connectomics research	Multiple	Multiscale	Images (3D, 4D)	Various	No	
Neuroelectro.org	Electrophysiology of neurons	Human, others	Neuron	Electrophysiological properties and data	Healthy	No	
Neuromorpho.org	3D models of real neurons	Human, rat, mouse, monkey, others	Neuron	Images and 3D data	Healthy	No	
Neuromorphometrics.com	Manually labeled MRI Brain Scans	Human	Macroscopic	T1-weighted MRI, labeled volumes	Healthy	No	
NeuronDB	Database of Neuron properties and classification	Human	Neuron	Descriptive	Healthy	No	
Neuroimaging Tools and Resources Collaboratory (NITRC)	Award-winning free collaboratory with over 1000 neuroinformatics software tools, imaging datasets, and community resources including forums and events.	Human, mouse, rat, other	Microscopic, macroscopic	Datasets	Healthy and diseased	No	
Open Access Series of Imaging Studies (OASIS)	Structural MRI images	Human	Macroscopic	MRI datasets	Healthy and Alzheimer's disease	Yes	
Open Connectome Project	Database of different circuitry frameworks and neuroimaging datasets, including volumetric datasets, atlases, and connectomics research	Human, mouse, bat, zebrafish, insect, other	Multilevel: brain regions, connections, neurons, gene expression patterns	Images and 3D data	Healthy	No	
openfnirs	a meta-database specific to fNIRS data. The "Openfnirs meta-database" (https://openfnirs.org/data/) is a part of the openfnirs initiative whose mission is to foster the development of an fNIRS ecosystem and to promote the open dissemination of fNIRS hardware and software, as well as provide access to resources, documentation and training opportunities for fNIRS users.	Human	Macroscopic	fNIRS (Functional_near-infrared_spectroscopy)	Healthy and eventually various diseases	No	
OpenNeuro	Large and diverse collection of raw data from various research studies distributed under permissive licenses (CC0 and CC BY). All datasets are formatted according to the same format (Brain Imaging Data Structure) and can be accessed via Amazon S3.	Human	Macroscopic	Functional, structural, diffusion MRI, and Magnetoencephalography datasets	Healthy and various diseases	No	
Open MEG Archive (OMEGA)	Magnetoencephalography, structural MRI datasets, and demographics	Human	Macroscopic	MEG, T1 MRI datasets, demographic data	Healthy, ADHD, Traumatic brain injury	Yes	
The PAIN Repository	Structural, Diffusion and Functional MRI datasets	Human	Human Macroscopic	MRI datasets and Metadata	Healthy and Pain Conditions	Yes	
Pig Brain Atlas	Pig Brain Atlas is a three-dimensional MRI-based averaged brain and atlas of the neonatal piglet (Sus scrofa).	Pig (Sus scrofa)	Macroscopic	Structural MRI	Healthy	Yes	
Primate Cell Type Database	PrimateDatabase.com, a publicly available web-accessible archive of intracellular patch clamp recordings and highly detailed three-dimensional digital reconstructions of neuronal morphology.	Non-human primate and human	Neuron	Electrophysiology, Morphology and 3-d Reconstructions	Healthy	No	
SchizConnect	SchizConnect is an open, public search-and-download virtual database for schizophrenia neuroimaging (MRI) images and related data.	Human	Macroscopic	Structural, Diffusion and Functional MRI datasets, cognitive and clinical assessments	Schizophrenia (+ siblings), Bipolar Disorder, Controls (+ siblings)	Yes	
Temple EEG Database	Over 30,000 clinical EEGs and accompanying neurologist reports	Human	Macroscopic	EEG	Healthy and various diseases	Yes	
Ultrahigh resolution T1-weighted whole brain MR dataset	T1-weighted MR data acquired using prospective motion correction at an ultrahigh isotropic resolution of 250 μm.	Human	Mesoscopic	Structural MRI dataset including scanner's raw to processed data	Healthy	No	
UNC-Wisconsin Neurodevelopment Rhesus MRI Database	Structural and Diffusion Weighted MRI images in Native and Atlas Space	Macaque	Macroscopic	MRI datasets	Healthy	No	
Whole Brain Atlas	Atlas, Structural MRI images and PET images	Human	Macroscopic	Images	Healthy and various diseases	No	
NeuroVault	Unthresholded statistical maps from MRI and PET studies.	Human	Macroscopic	Images	Healthy and various diseases	No	

== Databases of neuroscience databases ==
Name	Description	Organism	Level (gene, neuron, macroscopic)	Data (MRI, fMRI, images, descriptive, numerical)	Disorder	Register to view data?	Ref.
Neuroscience Information Framework	A meta database of neuroscience-relevant data incorporating over 100 databases.	Human, mouse, rat, worm	Microscopic, macroscopic	Datasets	Healthy and diseased	No	

== See also ==
- Neuroinformatics
- Budapest Reference Connectome
