= International Neuroinformatics Coordinating Facility =

International organization promoting open neuroscience standards and practices

- Abbreviation: INCF
- Formation: 2005; 21 years ago
- Headquarters: INCF Secretariat
- Location: Karolinska Institutet, Stockholm, Sweden
- Coordinates: 59°20′54.46″N 18°1′25.78″E
- Governing Board Chair: Maryann Martone
- Website: incf.org

The International Neuroinformatics Coordinating Facility (INCF) is an international non-profit organization with the mission to develop, evaluate, and endorse standards and best practices that embrace the principles of Open, FAIR, and Citable neuroscience. INCF also provides training on how standards and best practices facilitate reproducibility and enables the publishing of the entirety of research output, including data and code. INCF was established in 2005 by recommendations of the Global Science Forum working group of the OECD. The INCF is hosted by the Karolinska Institutet in Stockholm, Sweden. The INCF network comprises institutions, organizations, companies, and individuals active in neuroinformatics, neuroscience, data science, technology, and science policy and publishing. The Network is organized in governing bodies and working groups which coordinate various categories of global neuroinformatics activities that guide and oversee the development and endorsement of standards and best practices, as well as provide training on how standards and best practices facilitate reproducibility and enables the publishing of the entirety of research output, including data and code. The current Directors are Mathew Abrams and Helena Ledmyr, and the Governing Board Chair is Maryann Martone

The INCF network aims to promote the application of computational approaches to understanding the brain and to develop the infrastructure required to use computational methods to integrate and analyze diverse data across scales, techniques, and species to understand the brain and positively impact the health and well-being of society.

== Background ==
Current understanding of the nervous system integrates neuroscience with information sciences. Neuroscience uses techniques and concepts ranging from genetics to brain imaging of behaviour in humans and other species, under different functional states. This results in large quantities of data, which have become more complex as techniques have evolved. The data produced are heterogeneous, coming from different levels of study and modalities of analysis. Efficient analysis of these data requires the sharing of:

1. neuroscience data and knowledge databases;
2. analytical and modelling tools; and
3. computational models.

This challenge is being met through the merging of neurosciences with information science – the field of neuroinformatics.

== History ==
=== Genesis ===
The recommendation to coordinate international efforts in the new field of neuroinformatics was first made in the report on bioinformatics elaborated under the aegis of the then OECD Megascience Forum in 1998. Following extensive discussions in the Neuroinformatics Working Group of the Global Science Forum chaired by Dr. Stephen H. Koslow, the proposal to create an International Neuroinformatics Coordinating Council and a system of grant funding for neuroinformatics research was then presented in 2002. This project was endorsed by OECD science ministers at their meeting in January 2004. Sixteen countries (Australia, Canada, China, the Czech Republic, Denmark, Finland, France, Germany, India, Italy, Japan, the Netherlands, Norway, Sweden, Switzerland, the United Kingdom, the United States and Victoria, Australia), as well as the European Commission, then elaborated the working documents that form the legal basis for the INCF and the Programme in International Neuroinformatics (PIN).

=== Establishment ===
The conditions laid out for the creation of the INCF were met in July 2005, seven countries (the Czech Republic, Finland, Germany, Norway, Sweden, Switzerland, and the United States) having signed the Understanding document and pledged their financial contribution. A bid to host the INCF Secretariat was launched. Two proposals were received and, as instructed by the Governing Board, on November 3, the OECD convened a panel of experts to review and rank the proposals. The panel assigned the higher ranking to the Swedish proposal, and this recommendation was endorsed by the INCF Governing Board when it met at OECD headquarters on November 28. Following extensive international discussions, the INCF was officially inaugurated in February 2007, with headquarters at the Karolinska Institute in Stockholm.

INCF promotes collaboration in neuroinformatics and reproducibility in brain research by

- providing coordination of global neuroscience infrastructure through the development and endorsement of standards and best practices in support of open and FAIR (Findable Accessible Interoperable Reusable) neuroscience (FAIR data)
- training researchers, administrators, and students on how neuroinformatics promotes rigor and reproducibility, open and FAIR science and publishing the entirety of their research output: narrative, data, and code
- encouraging neuroscience as discipline to move towards FORCE (FAIR, Open, Research-object based, and Citable Ecosystem)
- promoting the advancement and continued development of neuroinformatics as a scientific discipline

=== Key Program deliverables ===
include

- Waxholm Space (WHS), a coordinate-based reference space of the rodent brain
- Scalable Brain Atlas, a web-based display engine for brain atlases, imaging data, and topologies
- NineML, a general model description language
- The Multi-Simulation Coordinator (MUSIC), which allows large-scale neuron simulators and other applications to communicate during runtime
- The Neuroimaging Informatics Data Model (NI-DM), a framework for the generation, storage, and query of metadata including provenance information
- KnowledgeSpace, a community-based encyclopaedia that links brain research concepts with data, models and literature from around the world
- TrainingSpace, an online repository linking neuroinformatics training resources developed both by INCF, our partners, and existing community resources.

== See also ==
- Brain Imaging Data Structure (BIDS)
- Blue Brain Project
- Budapest Reference Connectome
- Human Connectome Project
- List of neuroscience databases
- Neuroscience Information Framework
