= Organization for Human Brain Mapping =

Scientific organization

The Organization for Human Brain Mapping (OHBM) is an international society of scientists dedicated to advancing the understanding of the anatomical and functional organization of the human brain using neuroimaging. Among its main activities is the organization of annual conferences named "Annual Meeting of the Organization for Human Brain Mapping."

The organization was established in 1995 in Paris, where its inaugural meeting, named "International Conference on Human Brain Mapping", took place with over 800 people attending it. Its senior organizers were Bernard Mazoyer, Rüdiger Seitz, and Per Roland. In the following years, OHBM, in coordination with the International Society for Cerebral Blood Flow & Metabolism (ISCBFM), organized several additional conferences, namely, in Boston, Copenhagen, and Cologne. Although the 1999 meetings of the two societies were still coordinated, ISCBFM and OHBM have since split completely.

OHBM's stated mission is "to advance the understanding of the anatomical and functional organization of the human brain" by bringing "together scientists of various backgrounds who are engaged in investigations relevant to human brain organization" and engaging "in other activities to facilitate communication among these scientists and promote education in human brain organization." OHBM's past and present council members include, among others, David Van Essen, Russell Poldrack, Leslie Ungerleider, Alan Evans, Albert Gjedde, Richard Frackowiak, Marcus Raichle, and Karl Friston.

Since human brain mapping is a cross-disciplinary scientific field, OHBM's members range from neurologists, psychiatrists, and psychologists to physicists, engineers, software developers, and statisticians. Over the past few years, the OHBM's annual conferences have been attended by between 2500 and 3000 attendees.

Besides organizing international conferences, the organization's activities include public advocacy for data sharing in its field as well as establishing and managing a task force on neuroinformatics. OHBM launched these activities when the American cognitive neuroscientist Michael Gazzaniga established the fMRI Data Center, which required researchers to submit scans from functional magnetic resonance imaging when publishing in the Journal of Cognitive Neuroscience.

Furthermore, OHBM grants several awards to individuals who have made significant contributions to the development of neuroscience during their career, including the Glass Brain Award (a lifetime achievement award), the Young Investigator Award (formerly known as the Wiley Young Investigator Award), and the OHBM Replication Award.

Previous winners of the Glass Brain Award include:

- Vince Calhoun
- Michael Petrides
- Deanna Barch
- Peter T. Fox
- Leslie Ungerleider
- Alan Evans
- Susan Y. Bookheimer
- David Van Essen
- Karl Friston
- Marcus E. Raichle
- Karl Zilles

Aperture Neuro is the organization's affiliate publishing platform. In the past, members of the organization have benefited from reduced rates for the academic journals NeuroImage and Human Brain Mapping.

OHBM's administrative office is located in Minneapolis, MN, United States.
