= Peter T. Fox =

American neuroimaging researcher, neurologist, and professor

Peter T. Fox is a neuroimaging researcher and neurologist at the University of Texas Health Science Center at San Antonio. He is a professor in the Department of Radiology with joint appointments in Radiology, Medicine, and Psychiatry. He is the founding director of the Research Imaging Institute.

== Career ==
Fox received an MD from Georgetown University School of Medicine, interned at Duke University School of Medicine and completed a neurology residency and fellowship at Washington University in St. Louis.

Working with Marcus Raichle, he pioneered visual stimulation, language, memory and mental calculation studies with PET. He also developed spatial normalization for brain images, which standardizes multiple subjects' brains within a common coordinate system. Spatial normalization was essential to group averaging of brain images, which allowed increased signal-to-noise across multiple subjects and group-wise statistical analyses to be performed on individual coordinates.

During this time, Fox demonstrated that neuronal activity and brain blood flow were not directly related, or were "uncoupled". He was a senior staff scientist at Johns Hopkins University before taking a position at the University of Texas Health Science Center at San Antonio in 1991.

While at San Antonio, Fox helped develop the Talairach Daemon, a commonly used template for brain normalization. He initiated the BrainMap database which stores results from functional and structural human neuroimaging studies for coordinate-based meta-analysis, and has overseen the development of Scribe, Sleuth, and GingerALE, a pipeline of freely available software for coding, searching, and meta-analyzing the BrainMap Database.

Fox has also pioneered image-guided transcranial magnetic stimulation in multiple brain diseases. Fox's method uses patient-specific magnetic resonance images (MRI) to create a three-dimensional model of each patient's brain. Once localized, a treatment brain region is targeted with the help of a robotic arm, which moves the TMS coil to the appropriate location. Fox has multiple patents for this treatment design protocol.

Fox is founding co-editor of Human Brain Mapping with Jack L. Lancaster. He is a past-president of the Organization for Human Brain Mapping (2004–2005). He is also a founding member and primary research partner of the International Consortium for Brain Mapping. At the University of Texas Health Science Center at San Antonio, Fox is a well-known teacher and mentor and has won multiple awards for his service to the faculty and trainees.

Fox was named 2003’s Most Highly Cited Scientist in the neurosciences and from 2004 to the present has consistently been listed in the 100 most highly cited scientists in neuroscience, with over 32831 citations.

== Select publications ==
- Smith, Stephen Mark; Fox, Peter; Miller, Karla L.; et al. (2009). "Correspondence of the brain's functional architecture during activation and rest". Proceedings of the National Academy of Sciences of the United States of America. 106 (31): 13040–5. Bibcode:2009PNAS..10613040S. doi:10.1073/pnas.0905267106. PMC 2722273. PMID 19620724. Wikidata Q23891366.
- Lancaster, Jack; Marty G. Woldorff; Lawrence M. Parsons; et al. (2000). "Automated Talairach Atlas labels for functional brain mapping". Human Brain Mapping. 10 (3): 120–131. doi:10.1002/1097-0193(200007)10:3<120::aid-hbm30>3.0.co;2-8. PMID 10912591. S2CID 19025072. Wikidata Q23890369.
- Fox, Peter; Raichle, Marcus E. (1986). "Focal physiological uncoupling of cerebral blood flow and oxidative metabolism during somatosensory stimulation in human subjects". Proceedings of the National Academy of Sciences of the United States of America. 83 (4): 1140–1144. Bibcode:1986PNAS...83.1140F. doi:10.1073/pnas.83.4.1140. PMC 323027. PMID 3485282. Wikidata Q35591436.
