= Lucina Uddin =

American neuroscientist

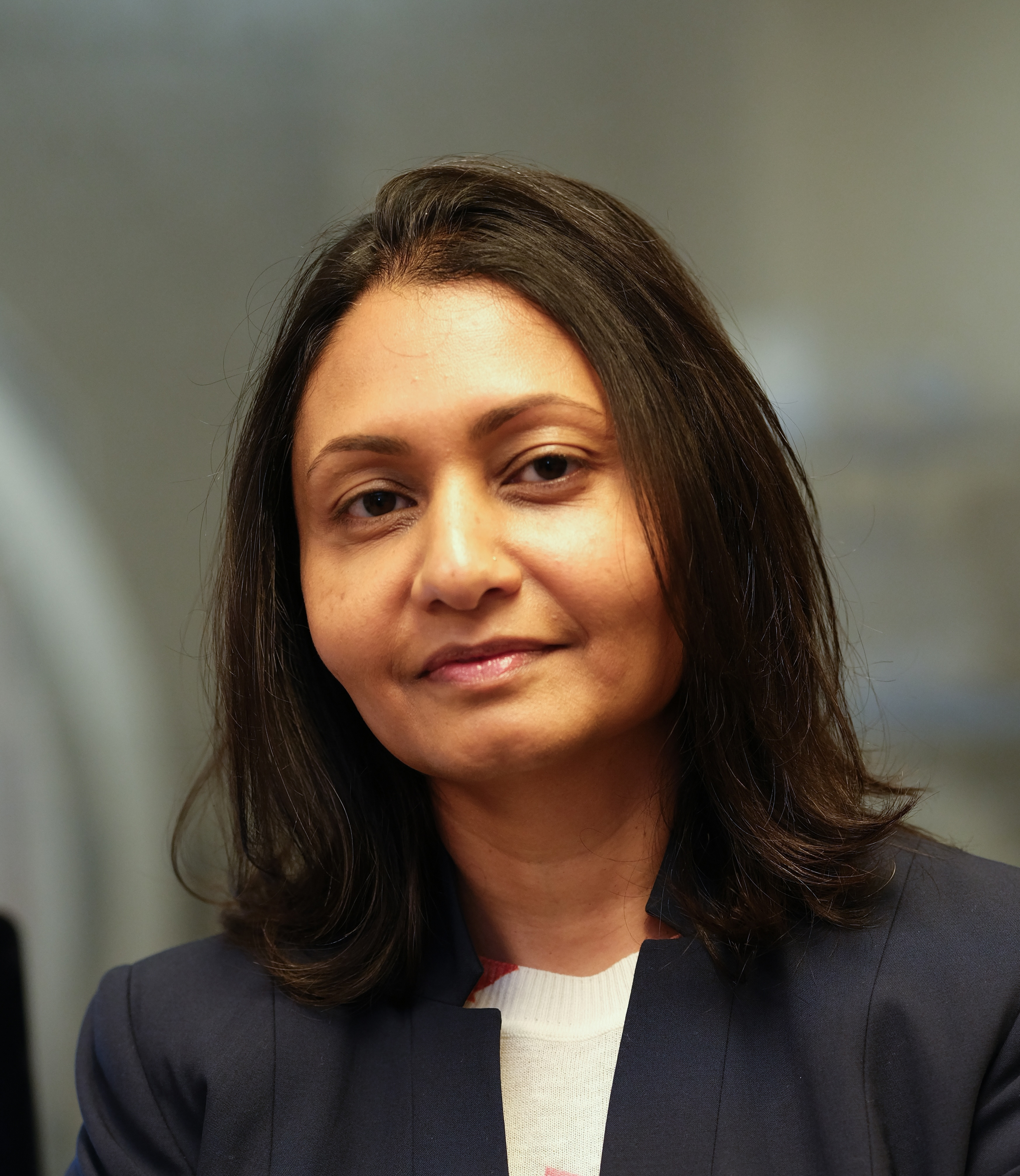
- Born: Lucina Q. Uddin; Chittagong, Bangladesh
- Education: University of California, Los Angeles
- Occupation: Neuroscientist
- Scientific career
- Workplaces: University of California, Los Angeles; Stanford University; New York University; University of Miami
- Thesis: Neural correlates of visual self-recognition (2006)

Lucina Q. Uddin is an American cognitive neuroscientist who is a professor at the University of California, Los Angeles. Her research investigates the relationship between brain connectivity and cognition in typical and atypical development using network neuroscience approaches.

== Early life and education ==
Uddin was born in Bangladesh. Her parents immigrated with her to the United States when she was less than one year old, and Uddin spent her childhood in Southern California. She was an undergraduate student at the University of California, Los Angeles (UCLA), where she majored in neuroscience and minored in philosophy. She stayed at UCLA for graduate school, where she explored neural correlates of self-recognition working with Eran Zaidel and Marco Iacoboni. During her graduate studies she worked alongside Susan Y. Bookheimer and Mirella Dapretto on neuroimaging studies to better understand autism spectrum disorder. She moved to New York as a postdoctoral scholar, where she worked with Francisco Xavier Castellanos in the Child Study Center. In 2008, she continued her postdoctoral studies at Stanford University, where she worked in the research group of Vinod Menon.

Uddin took a break from her research at Stanford between July and December 2010 to accept a position as an instructor at the Asian University for Women (AUW), located in Chittagong, Bangladesh – the city where she was born. AUW is the first regional liberal arts institution of its kind, and its mission is based on the belief that higher education provides a critical path to economic progress and social equality for women.

== Research and career ==
Uddin was an associate professor in the cognitive and behavioral neuroscience division which she created in the department of psychology at the University of Miami. She directed the Brain Connectivity and Cognition Laboratory, which makes use of neuroimaging to better understand the relationship between neural connectivity and cognition. At the University of Miami, Uddin established a graduate program in cognitive and behavioral neuroscience. In 2018, she was appointed a CIFAR Azrieli Global Scholar. Her current research examines brain network dynamics and cognitive flexibility in neurodevelopmental disorders.

In 2021, Uddin returned to UCLA, where she was appointed professor and director of the Center for Cognitive Neuroscience Analysis Core at the Semel Institute for Neuroscience and Behavior. Her lab uses resting state fMRI and diffusion tensor imaging data to examine large-scale brain networks, and how these networks support executive function.

Uddin has developed and refined an influential model of brain network dynamics centered on the unique role of the insular cortex and salience network (Menon & Uddin, 2010) that is the topic of her 2016 book Salience Network of the Human Brain. This model delineates how transient signals from the insula mediate dynamic interactions between large-scale functional brain networks, and has substantially influenced psychiatry and neurology, as it accounts for how a range of developmental pathologies can arise from disruptions to core brain network nodes. This work is a part of a larger research program investigating the neural basis of cognitive flexibility. Uddin's group tests the hypothesis that individual differences in brain dynamics underlie heterogeneity of cognitive flexibility across the lifespan. Based on her network neuroscience model of the insular cortex, her laboratory explores how the brain implements flexible cognition and behavior in neurotypical adults and clinical populations including children with autism spectrum disorder (ASD). In related work, her group explores alternate diagnostic nosologies using a Research Domain Criteria (RDoC) framework to parse heterogeneity of cognitive flexibility in children with prevalent neurodevelopmental disorders including ASD and attention-deficit/hyperactivity disorder (ADHD). The goal of these analyses is to identify children who might benefit from targeted interventions to treat cognitive flexibility deficits. Taken together, this line of work continues to reveal how brain dynamics underlie flexible cognition and behavior, providing clinically relevant insights.

In late 2024, Uddin filed a civil lawsuit in a United States District Court against six major academic publishers, alleging anti‑competitive behavior that has resulted in "tremendous harm" to science and the public interest. As of September 2024, the case is ongoing. Uddin was listed as one of the plaintiffs in a proposed class action against six major academic publishers, alleging conspiracy "to unlawfully appropriate billions of dollars that would otherwise have funded scientific research," as well as alleging that the publishers violated antitrust law by agreeing not to compete against each other for manuscripts and by denying scholars payment for peer review services. On January 30, 2026, the suit was dismissed because the plaintiffs never alleged a specific, factual agreement between the defendants, but instead attempted to sue on the basis of the standards of academic publishing as an industry.

== Awards and honors ==
- 2013: International Society for Autism Research Slifka Award
- 2015: Brain & Behavior Research Foundation NARSAD Young Investigator Grant
- 2015: NIMH Biobehavioral Research Award for Innovative New Scientists
- 2017: Organization for Human Brain Mapping Young Investigator Award
- 2017: USERN Prize in Medical sciences
- 2018: Canadian Institute for Advanced Research Azrieli Global Scholar - Brain, Mind & Consciousness Program
- 2021: Organization for Human Brain Mapping Diversity & Inclusivity Champion Award
- 2023: Society of Biological Psychiatry A.E. Bennett Award for Basic Research
- 2023: Flux: The Society for Developmental Cognitive Neuroscience Linda Spear Mid-career Award
- 2025: Fellow of Organization for Human Brain Mapping

== Selected publications ==
=== Academic articles ===
- Menon V; Uddin LQ (June 2010). "Saliency, switching, attention and control: a network model of insula function". Brain Structure and Function. 214 (5–6): 655–67. doi:10.1007/s00429-010-0262-0. ISSN 1863-2653. PMC 2899886. PMID 20512370. Wikidata Q29619521.

=== Books ===
- Uddin, Lucina Q (2017). Salience network of the human brain. London, United Kingdom: Academic Press. ISBN 978-0-12-804594-7. OCLC 957597666.
- Uddin, Lucina Q (2014). Insula: neuroanatomy, functions and clinical disorders. New York, USA: Nova Science Publishers. ISBN 978-1-63117-176-5. OCLC 923674916.
