= OpenNeuro =

Neuroimaging database

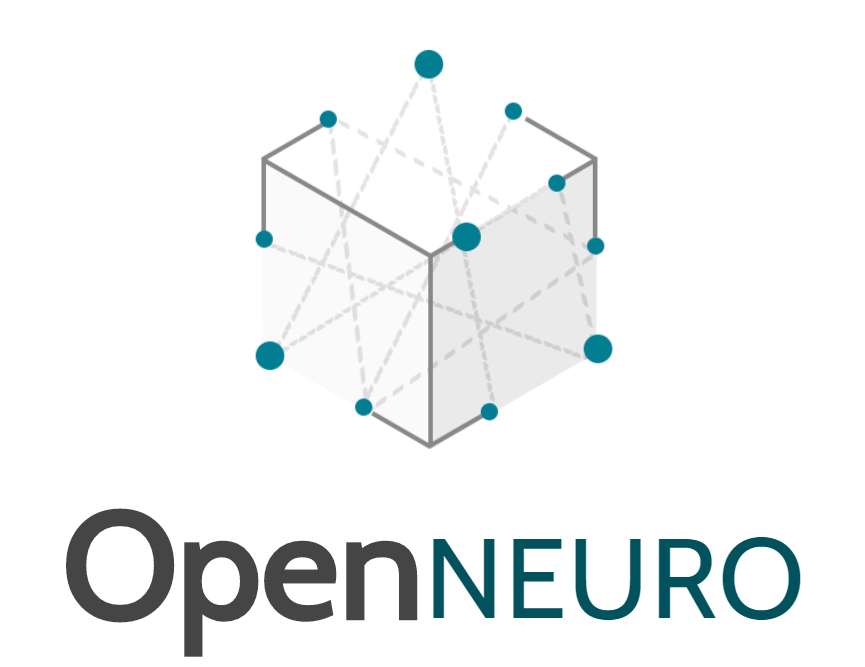
- Website type: Data repository
- Creators: Russell Poldrack and Chris Gorgolewski
- Website: https://openneuro.org
- Commercial: No
- Launched: September 2011
- Content license: CC0

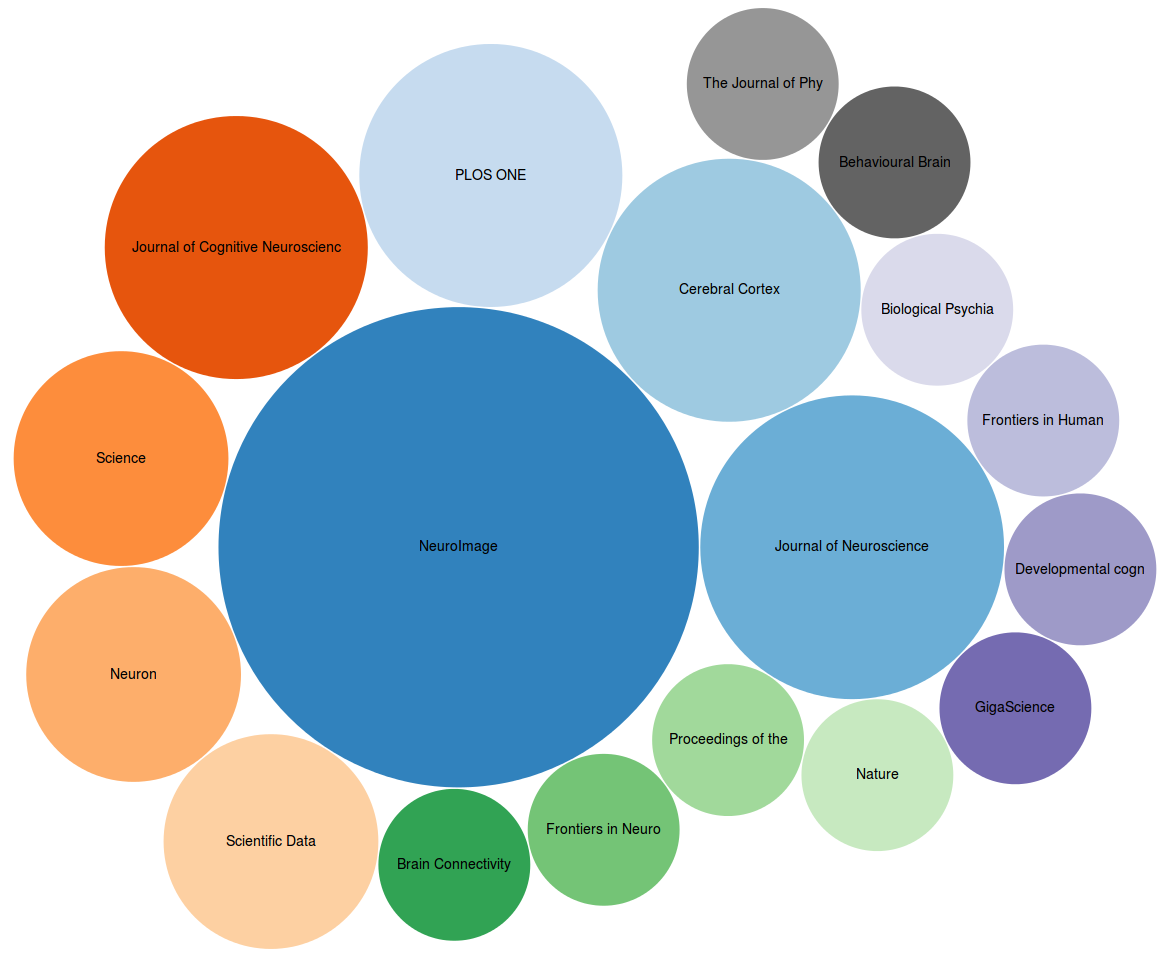
OpenfMRI journal statistics, September 2016.

OpenNeuro (originally OpenfMRI) is an open-science neuroinformatics database storing datasets from human brain imaging research studies.

The database is available online. OpenNeuro accepts datasets formatted from brain imaging research according to a community-developed standard, and uploaded datasets are made available with minimal restrictions to the public at large. The Research Resource Identifier for OpenNeuro is SCR_005031. Datasets that cannot be shared openly are not currently supported.

The research group that runs OpenNeuro described the system in a Frontiers in Neuroinformatics article in 2013 and a NeuroImage article in 2015.

As of 2025, the National Institutes of Health has awarded OpenNeuro over 8 million dollars in research funding, and researchers have mentioned OpenNeuro in over 200 articles in open access literature.

== History ==
The Neuroimaging Informatics Tools and Resources Clearinghouse made available two other online neuroimaging databases, which both predated OpenNeuro. One was the fMRI Data Center (fMRIDC), which collected similar data but distributed via physical media. The fMRIDC no longer accepts data submissions. The other repository was the 1000 Functional Connectomes Project, which collected data from resting-state fMRI studies.

In February 2018, the research group behind OpenfMRI renamed the database to OpenNeuro to reflect broader range of accepted data and switched to a new data submission and management platform.

From 2019 through 2024, NIH has awarded OpenNeuro over 8 million dollars in research funding through the National Institute of Neurological Disorders and Stroke and the National Institute of Mental Health (NIMH). The project is currently funded through NIMH 5R24MH117179.

In 2024, a team of Dartmouth researchers used OpenNeuro data to create OpenNeuro Average, a template for mapping the surface of the brain.

In April 2025, OpenNeuro, along with at least 33 other online archives, placed a disclaimer on their site that read, "This repository is under review for potential modification in compliance with Administration directives" as a result of Executive Order 14168.

== Features ==
According to the BRAIN Initiative Alliance, OpenNeuro has the following features:

- OpenNeuro is designed to make sharing raw imaging datasets as easy as possible.
- OpenNeuro provides a rich view of datasets and files by using standards for data validation and metadata extraction.
- OpenNuero versions data using modern research data management tools and persistent digital object identifiers.
- Data are made accessible through multiple open protocols, ensuring high availability and resiliency.
- Datasets may be embargoed for 36 months. Multiple collaborators can be given write access, and anonymous review links can provide read-only access to peer reviewers.
- Dataset authors may upload datasets of any size.
- Users may search for datasets according to criteria such as name, participant demographics, imaging modality or task, and retrieve all or parts of the datasets programmatically.
- Reviewers may comment on datasets, requesting clarification or suggesting improvements in metadata, to ensure datasets are correctly interpreted.
- Third-party metadata indexers may combine OpenNeuro metadata with other repositories to provide novel search and query infrastructure.
- Open licensing (CC0) of datasets ensures maximum reusability.
- Reliance on the BIDS validator ensures higher metadata consistency across datasets.
- Automated validation using the BIDS validator enables researchers to test their dataset prior to upload.

== Team ==
The group is a collaboration across NIMH, Stanford University, and the University of Copenhagen. Adam Thomas has directed the NIMH team, with Robert Innis as the Principal Investigator and Anthony Galassi as the software engineer. Russ Poldrack, a professor of psychology at Stanford, has been the contact person for this team. The software developers at Stanford who have worked on OpenNeuro include Christopher Markiewicz, Nell Hardcastle, and Ross Blair. Other collaborators include Melanie Ganz-Benjaminsen, an associate professor at the University of Copenhagen.

== Controversy ==
Former NIMH Director Joshua A. Gordon claims that transgender people are at higher risk for mental disorder, including suicide, and collecting data on gender identity allows researchers to study links between mental health and transgender people. However, in January 2025, President Donald Trump issued Executive Order 14168, which instructs federal departments to operate under a gender binary and withdraw recognition of transgender people. Gordon claims "it doesn't matter" whether these categories are "biologically true" or "societally induced" because they identify a high-risk group of people that need help. In April 2025, OpenNeuro, along with at least 33 other online archives, placed a disclaimer on their site that the database is under review as a result of the executive order. Gordon criticized proposals to remove data on gender identity as "incredibly disturbing", detrimental to research, and preventing transgender people from getting the help they need.

== See also ==
- Database
- Data set
- Data repository
- Data storage
- Metascience
- Neuroinformatics
- Neuroimaging
  - EEG
  - MEG
  - MRI
  - PET
- Open Data
