= Francisco Xavier Castellanos =

Bolivian American neuroscientist

- Born: Francisco Xavier Castellanos; November 16, 1953 (age 72); Madrid, Spain
- Occupation: Director of Research at the NYU Child Study Center
- Years active: 1976–present

F. Xavier Castellanos (born November 16, 1953) is a Bolivian neuroscientist who is the director of research at the NYU Child Study Center. His work aims at elucidating the neuroscience of ADHD through structural and functional brain imaging studies, collaborating on molecular genetic studies, and coordinating an interdisciplinary network of translational investigators (the ADHD Neuroscience Network). Dr. Castellanos chaired the NIH ‘Initial Review Group’ (Study Section) on Developmental Psychopathology and Developmental Disabilities from 2005–2007 and was chairing the revision of the diagnostic criteria for externalizing disorders for the at the time forthcoming edition of DSM-5, which was released in 2013. He continues to make significant contributions to research into the neurobiological substrates of attention deficit hyperactivity disorder.

== Biography ==
Francisco Xavier Castellanos was born in Madrid, Spain, on November 16, 1953, to Bolivian parents. When he was four, he, his mother and his two siblings returned to Bolivia, where they lived until he was nine, when the family moved to Washington, D.C. and a year later, to New Orleans, Louisiana. An avid reader, especially intrigued with science and math, he attended Catholic schools in New Orleans and later received a scholarship to Vassar College, where he became fascinated with the work of Noam Chomsky. At Vassar, he established an independent major in linguistics and graduated with honors in 1975.

After graduation, working as a professional translator in New Orleans, during which time he translated Jean Piaget's Epistemology and Psychology of Functions: Studies in Genetic Epistemology from French to English, Dr. Castellanos began work on a master's degree in experimental psychology at The University of New Orleans, where he became fascinated by the discovery of endorphins. Following this interest, he applied to and was accepted at The Louisiana State University Medical College at Shreveport. After winning several awards, including the prestigious Chancellor's Award for Overall Excellence and induction into AOA, the national medical honor society, he graduated in 1986 and continued his medical training at The University of Kentucky, where he was one of the first graduates of the "Triple Board" program in psychiatry, pediatrics and child psychiatry. During his residency, he won the Abraham Wikler, M.D. Award for Outstanding Psychiatry Resident and was awarded a mini-fellowship in the American Psychiatric Association's Program for Minority Research Training in Psychiatry.

In 1991, Dr. Castellanos became a Research Fellow in the Child Psychiatry Branch of the National Institute of Mental Health, where he worked under the supervision of Dr. Judith L. Rapoport. As a senior staff fellow, he was the head of the ADHD Research Unit and received an award for Excellence in Clinical Care and Research from the National Institute of Mental Health. During this time he also became a fellow in the American Academy of Pediatrics.

In 2001, he left the NIMH to assume the position of Director of Research Training at the New York University Child Study Center.

Dr. Castellanos is the Brooke and Daniel Neidich Professor of Child and Adolescent Psychiatry at the New York University School of Medicine. He is also the director of research at the NYU Child Study Center and the Director of the Phyllis Green and Randolph Cōwen Institute for Pediatric Neuroscience. He is board certified by the American Board of Pediatrics and the American Board of Psychiatry and Neurology in general psychiatry.

== Awards and recognition ==
Dr. Castellanos is a 2005 NARSAD Distinguished Investigator Grantee. In 2015, he won the Ruane Prize for Outstanding Achievement in Child and Adolescent Psychiatric Research, given by the Brain & Behavior Research Foundation.

== Selected publications ==
- Stimulant Drugs and ADHD: Basic and Clinical Neuroscience.

Edited by Mary V. Solanto, Amy F. T. Arnsten and F. Xavier Castellanos. Oct 2000, Oxford University Press.

- Castellanos FX, Sonuga-Barke EJ, Milham MP, Tannock R.

Characterizing cognition in ADHD: beyond executive dysfunction. Trends Cogn Sci. 2006 Mar;10(3):117-23.

- Castellanos FX, Sonuga-Barke EJ, Scheres A, Di Martino A, Hyde C, Walters JR.

Varieties of attention-deficit/hyperactivity disorder-related intra-individual variability. Biol Psychiatry. 2005 Jun 1;57(11):1416-23.

- Castellanos FX, Sharp WS, Gottesman RF, Greenstein DK, Giedd JN, Rapoport JL.

Anatomic brain abnormalities in monozygotic twins discordant for attention deficit hyperactivity disorder. Am J Psychiatry. 2003 Sep;160(9):1693-6.

- Castellanos FX, Lee PP, Sharp W, Jeffries NO, Greenstein DK, Clasen LS,

Blumenthal JD, James RS, Ebens CL, Walter JM, Zijdenbos A, Evans AC, Giedd JN, Rapoport JL. Developmental trajectories of brain volume abnormalities in children and adolescents with attention-deficit/hyperactivity disorder. JAMA. 2002 Oct 9;288(14):1740-8.

- Castellanos FX, Tannock R.

Neuroscience of attention-deficit/hyperactivity disorder: the search for endophenotypes. Nat Rev Neurosci. 2002 Aug;3(8):617-28.

- Margulies DS, Kelly AMC, Uddin LQ, Biswal BB, Castellanos FX, Milham MP.

Mapping the functional connectivity of anterior cingulate cortex. Neuroimage. 2007 Aug 15;37(2):579-88.

- Castellanos FX, Margulies DS, Kelly C, Uddin LQ, Ghaffari M, Kirsch A, Shaw D,

Shehzad Z, Di Martino A, Biswal B, Sonuga-Barke EJ, Rotrosen J, Adler LA, Milham MP. Cingulate-Precuneus Interactions: A New Locus of Dysfunction in Adult Attention-Deficit/Hyperactivity Disorder. Biol Psychiatry. 2007 Sep 20;

- Kelly AMC, Uddin LQ, Biswal BB, Castellanos FX, Milham MP.

Competition between functional brain networks mediates behavioral variability. Neuroimage. 2007 Aug 23.

- Lucina Q. Uddin; Clare Kelly; Bharat B Biswal; Francisco Xavier Castellanos; Michael P Milham (1 February 2009). "Functional connectivity of default mode network components: correlation, anticorrelation, and causality". Human Brain Mapping. 30 (2): 625–637. doi:10.1002/HBM.20531. ISSN 1065-9471. PMC 3654104. PMID 18219617. Wikidata Q36844324.
