= NeuroVault =

- Website type: Data repository
- Creators: Chris Gorgolewski and others
- Website: https://neurovault.org
- Commercial: No
- Launched: January 2012
- Content license: CC0
- Written in: Python

NeuroVault is an open-science neuroinformatics online repository of brain statistical maps atlases and parcellations.

Neuroimaging researchers, having performed an neuroimaging studies, may upload their data to the site. Third-party researchers may download the data and use it, e.g., for re-analysis.

NeuroVault has been widely acknowledged as a trustworthy destination for scientists to deposit neuroimaging data associated with scholarly articles. In 2019 it has ranked 5th among all scientific data repositories in terms of the number of journals’ and publishers’ policies recommending it. Deposition of data in NeuroVault has also been recommended by the Organization for Human Brain Mapping

NeuroVault was created by Chris Gorgolewski but is currently maintained by the research group around Russell Poldrack, and they described the system in the scientific article NeuroVault.org: a web-based repository for collecting and sharing unthresholded statistical maps of the human brain from 2015, and later in NeuroVault.org: A repository for sharing unthresholded statistical maps, parcellations, and atlases of the human brain from 2016.

== See also ==
- Metascience
