= David Van Essen =

American neurobiologist

David C. Van Essen (born September 14, 1945) is an American neuroscientist specializing in neurobiology and studies the structure, function, development, connectivity and evolution of the cerebral cortex of humans and nonhuman relatives. After over two decades of teaching at the Washington University School of Medicine, he currently serves as an Alumni Endowed Professor of Neuroscience and maintains an active laboratory. Van Essen has held numerous positions, including Editor-in-Chief of the Journal of Neuroscience, secretary of the Society for Neuroscience, and the president of the Society for Neuroscience from 2006 to 2007. Additionally, Van Essen has received numerous awards for his efforts in education and science, including the Krieg Cortical Discoverer Award from the Cajal Club in 2002, the Peter Raven Lifetime Achievement Award from St. Louis Academy of Science in 2007, and the Second Century Award in 2015 and the Distinguished Educator Award in 2017, both from Washington University School of Medicine.

A key contributor to the understanding of the primate visual system, he created one of the most well-known maps of the visual pathway in the primate cortex with Dr. Daniel J. Felleman, based on anatomical tracing. This study laid the groundwork for understanding cortical systems in general as hierarchical circuits.

== Education ==
Van Essen received his undergraduate degree in chemistry in 1967 from California Institute of Technology. Working on the leech nervous system with John Graham Nicholls, he received his doctoral degree in Neurobiology in 1971 from Harvard University and continued as a postdoctoral fellow at Harvard University under David H. Hubel and Torsten Wiesel studying the visual cortex of cats. This experience led Van Essen to study visual systems. Van Essen continued to pursue additional postdoctoral work at the University of Oslo and at University College London where he studied the visual cortex of monkeys and developed a "pencil and tracing paper" method to make 2D cortical flat maps.

== Research career ==
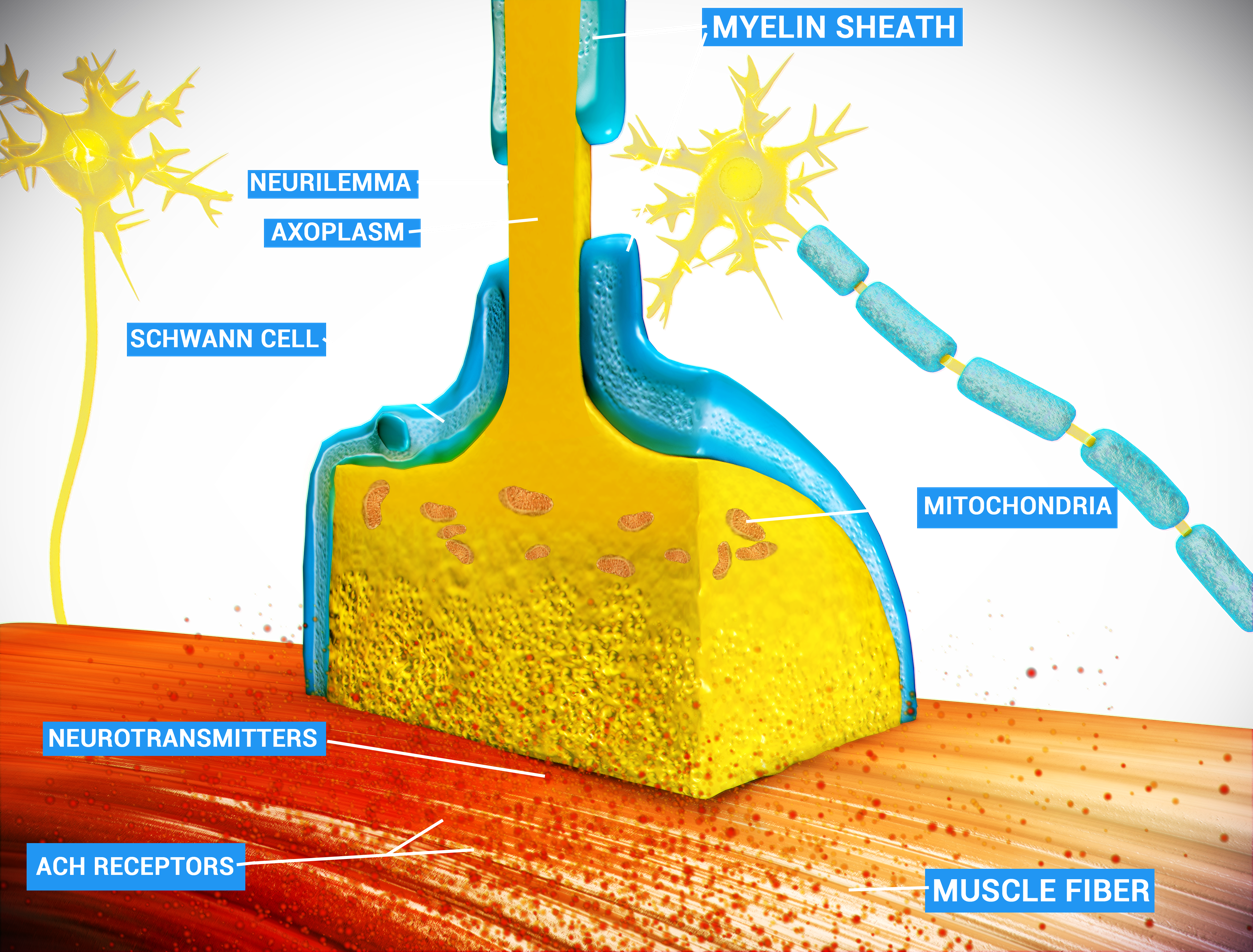
Neuromuscular Junction Diagram

Following his postdoctoral education, David Van Essen joined the faculty at California Institute of Technology in 1976. Following his time at Caltech, Van Essen then moved to Washington University in St. Louis in 1992, where he served as the Head of the Department of Anatomy and Neurobiology for two decades. Van Essen stepped down from this position in 2012. His earlier research included studies of simpler systems, including synapse elimination at the neuromuscular junction. Van Essen has hypothesized that tension along axons and dendrites accounts for many aspects of morphogenesis, including how and why the cortex gets its folds and how cortical folding abnormalities arise in brain disorders.

== Current research ==
Van Essen is employed at Washington University in St. Louis and manages a lab that examines the structure, function, connectivity, development, and evolution of the cerebral cortex in both humans and primates. His current research focuses primarily on cortical structure and function in disease models, such as autism, schizophrenia, and William Syndrome. With the use of neuroanatomical data collected through collaboration by Washington University and other private institutions, Van Essen's research has enhanced the development and utilization of different methods used in computerized brain mapping and neuroinformatics to enhance data findings and analysis. While Van Essen's cortical cartography methods began with manually-generated maps, this area of research has developed into the novel usage of software tools for brain visualization.

David Van Essen also led the Human Connectome Project (HCP) as the Principal Investigator together with Co-Principal Investigator Kamil Ugurbil; HCP is a 5-year project designed to map the human brain circuitry. This project uses various methods, such as structural and functional imaging methods, to analyze parcellation and connectivity of both human and nonhuman brains. Through the usage of over 1,200 brain models, the project allows researchers to relate their findings to behavioral phenotypes and genetic markers. Most recently, in collaboration with the HCP, the Van Essen lab has identified many visual areas in the macaque monkey and has characterized a novel parcellation of the human neocortex. This research has greatly advanced the current understanding of the hierarchical organization of the brain. Additionally, with a leading role in the HCP's development, the Van Essen lab is creating a Connectome Workbench for data to be freely available and stored.

Van Essen's laboratory also collaborates with Terrie Inder, Jeff Neil, Jason Hill, and other affiliates to conduct research on human cortical development. Here, the research team studies human cortical development in premature and mature infants to analyze normal cortical maturation and find cortical abnormalities that correspond to childhood developmental abnormalities. Additionally, Van Essen and his team have developed a data mining resource called SumsDB. This database, which features an extensive and accessible data repository, includes freely available results from both PET and fMRI scans.

Brain Circuits

== Contributions ==
David Van Essen's contributions towards the neurobiology field focus on the central nervous system as well as data sharing. His contributions to the Human Connectome Project provides the mapping of the brain and widespread sharing of the project to promote neuroinformatics. More specifically, the Connectome Workbench has provided a user-friendly platform in order to access various levels of data. Furthermore, while participating in the Society for Neuroscience, Van Essen contributed to the Neuroinformatics Committee. While the committee existed only five years, the subfield continues to grow in recognition and importance. Van Essen has contributed to mapping cortical convolutions; first by hand, then computerizing the process leading to the development of computerized cortical cartography.

== Selected publications ==
David Van Essen's most cited publications are referenced below:

- Fox, M. D.; Snyder, A. Z.; Vincent, J. L.; Corbetta, M.; Van Essen, D. C.; Raichle, M. E. (2005). "The human brain is intrinsically organized into dynamic, anticorrelated functional networks". Proceedings of the National Academy of Sciences. 102 (27): 9673–9678. Bibcode:2005PNAS..102.9673F. doi:10.1073/pnas.0504136102. PMC 1157105. PMID 15976020.
- Van Essen, D. C.; Drury, H. A.; Dickson, J.; Harwell, J.; Hanlon, D.; Anderson, C. H. (2001). "An Integrated Software Suite for Surface-based Analyses of Cerebral Cortex". Journal of the American Medical Informatics Association. 8 (5): 443–459. doi:10.1136/jamia.2001.0080443. PMC 131042. PMID 11522765.
- Van Essen, David C.; Newsome, William T.; Maunsell, John H.R. (1984). "The visual field representation in striate cortex of the macaque monkey: Asymmetries, anisotropies, and individual variability". Vision Research. 24 (5): 429–448. doi:10.1016/0042-6989(84)90041-5. PMID 6740964. S2CID 2410925.
