= OHBM Replication Award =

Organization for Human Brain Mapping award

- Awarded for: A neuroimaging replication study of exceptional quality and impact.
- Presented by: Organization for Human Brain Mapping (OHBM)
- First award: 2017
- Currently held by: Helmet T. Karim for "Independent replication of advanced brain age in mild cognitive impairment and dementia: detection of future cognitive dysfunction" (awarded in 2024)
- Website: humanbrainmapping.org

The OHBM Replication Award is an award presented annually by the Organization for Human Brain Mapping (OHBM). It is presented to a researcher in recognition of conducting and disseminating the results of a neuroimaging replication study of exceptional quality and impact.

== Winners ==
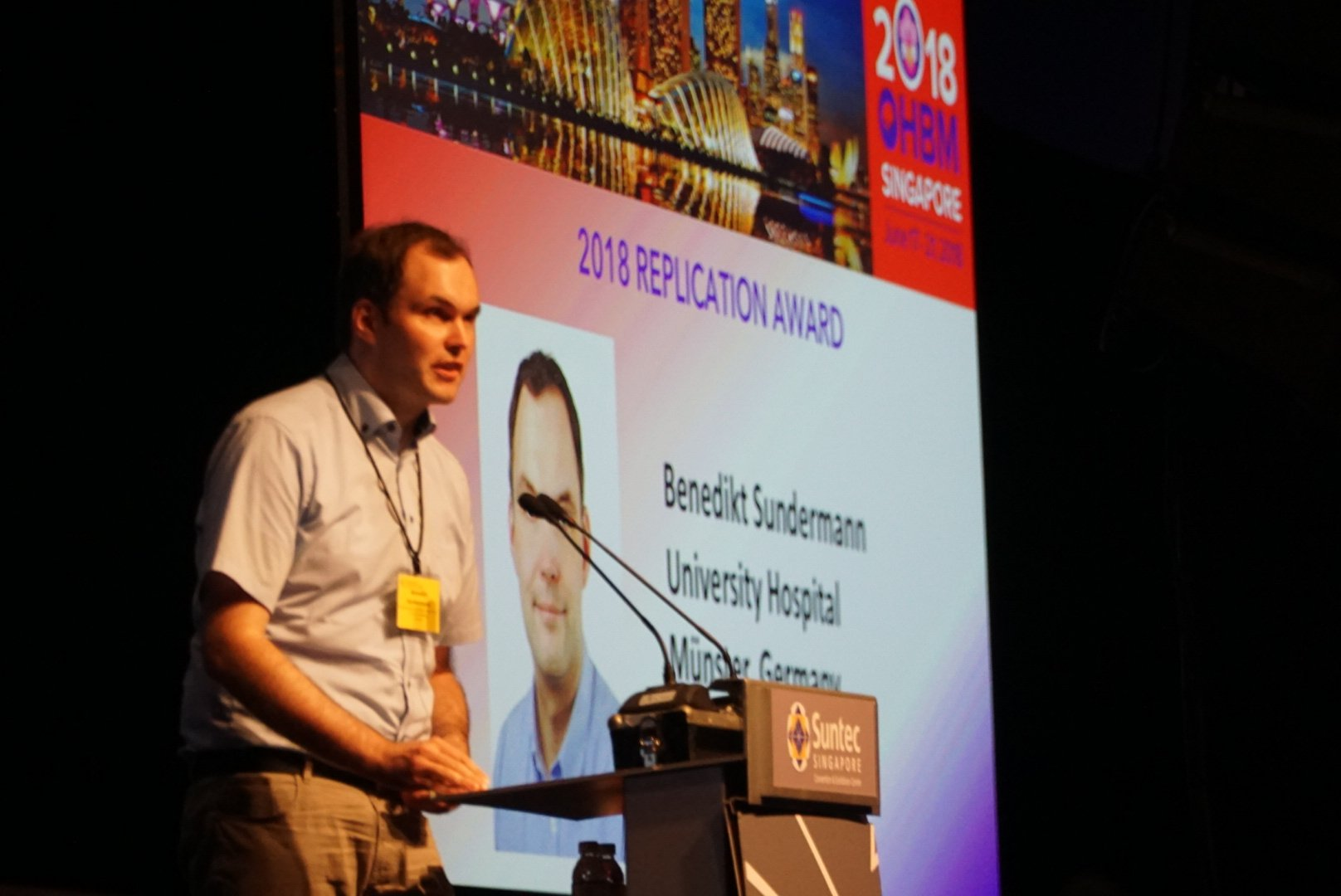
Benedikt Sundermann receives the 2018 OHBM Replication Award

Year	Researcher	Scientific Article
2024	Helmet T. Karim	"Independent replication of advanced brain age in mild cognitive impairment and dementia: detection of future cognitive dysfunction"
2023	Charles Laidi	"Cerebellar Atypicalities in Autism?"
2022	Lara J. Mentink	"Functional co-activation of the default mode network in APOE ε4-carriers: A replication study"
2021	Mingrui Xia	"Reproducibility of functional brain alterations in major depressive disorder: Evidence from a multisite resting-state functional MRI study with 1,434 individuals"
2020	Andre Altmann	"A comprehensive analysis of methods for assessing polygenic burden on Alzheimer's disease pathology and risk beyond APOE"
2019	Richard Dinga	"Evaluating the evidence for biotypes of depression: Methodological replication and extension of Drysdale et al. (2017)"
2018	Benedikt Sundermann	"Diagnostic classification of unipolar depression based on resting-state functional connectivity MRI: effects of generalization to a diverse sample"
2017	Wouter Boekel	"A purely confirmatory replication study of structural brain-behavior correlations"

== History ==
The award was originally conceived by Chris Gorgolewski as an attempt to elevate the status of replication studies, which were often considered not as prestigious as other scientific activities. Researchers focusing too much on novel discoveries instead of scrutinizing previously published findings was big contribution to reproducibility crisis in psychology.

The award has increased the likelihood of members of the neuroimaging community to conduct and disseminate results of replication studies and the procedure of running the award has been made publicly available in hope other academic communities could implement similar awards.

== See also ==
- List of neuroscience awards
