= Alan Evans (neuroscientist) =

Welsh-born Canadian neuroscientist

Professor Alan Evans OC FRS FRSC FCAHS
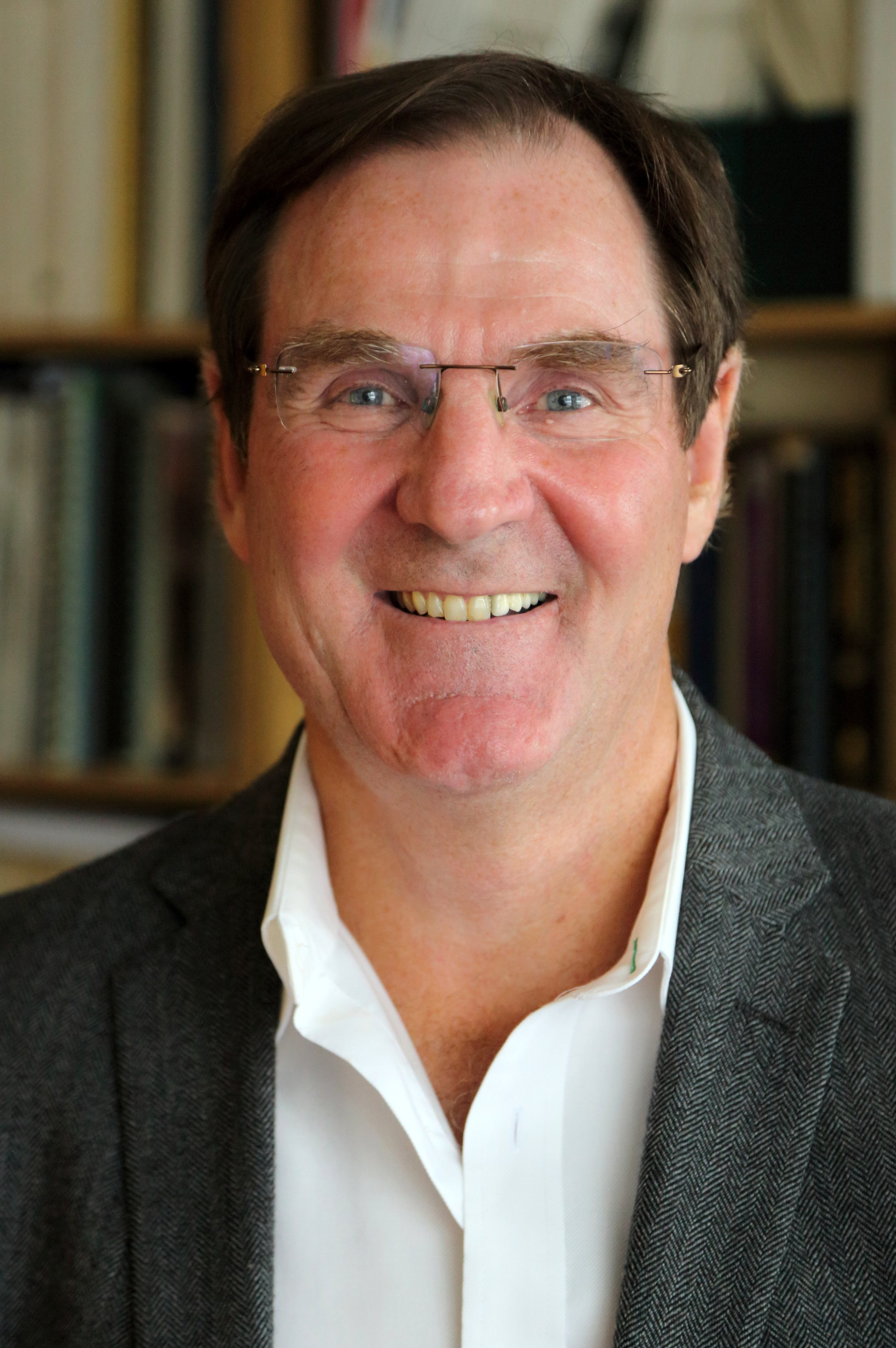

Distinguished James McGill Professor of Neuorlogy and Psychiatry, Victor Dahdaleh Professor of Neurosciences, McGill University

Personal details
- Born: Alan Charles Evans; 1952 (age 73–74) Barry, Wales
- Occupation: Professor

Alan Charles Evans OC FRS FRSC FCAHS FCAS is a Welsh-born Canadian neuroscientist who is a Distinguished James McGill Professor of Neurology and Neurosurgery, Psychiatry and Biomedical Engineering, and holds the Victor Dahdaleh Chair in Neurosciences at McGill University. He is also a researcher at the McConnell Brain Imaging Centre of the Montreal Neurological Institute, Co-Director of the Ludmer Centre for Neuroinformatics and Mental Health, Director of the McGill Centre for Integrative Neuroscience, Scientific Director of the Canadian Open Neuroscience Platform, Scientific Director of McGill's Healthy Brains, Healthy Lives program and Principal Investigator of CBRAIN, an initiative aiming to integrate Canadian neuroscience data with the Compute Canada computing network. He is recognized for his research on brain mapping, and was a co-founder of both the International Consortium for Brain Mapping and the Organization for Human Brain Mapping. He was OHBM Chair in 2017-18.

In 2014, he was awarded the Prix d’Innovation et d’Excellence Dr Jean-A.-Vézina for Québec radiology and the University of British Columbia's Margolese National Brain Disorders Prize. In the same year, he was recognized as an ISI Highly Cited Researcher in the category "Neuroscience and Behavior", a ranking he has maintained every year since then. He was elected a Fellow of the Royal Society of Canada in 2015. In 2016, he received the Wilder Penfield Prix du Québec and was ranked #6 in a list of 10 most influential neuroscientists of the modern era by Science magazine. In 2017, he was inducted as a Fellow of the Canadian Academy of Health Sciences and awarded the Senate of Canada 150 Medal. In 2018, he received the Heinz Lehmann Award for Outstanding Contributions to Neuropsychopharmacology and the Club de Recherches Cliniques du Québec Mentorship Award. In 2019, he received the Glass Brain Award from the Organization for Human Brain Mapping for lifetime achievement in neuroimaging. In 2020, he received the Izaak Walton Killam Memorial Prize, awarded to Canadian scholars who have made a substantial and distinguished contribution, over a significant period, to scholarly research. In 2021, he received the McLaughlin Medal from the Royal Society of Canada, awarded for important research of sustained excellence in medical science. In 2023, he was admitted to the Cuban Academy of Sciences, in recognition of over 30 years working with Cuban neuroscientists, most notably Prof. Pedro Valdes-Sosa. They jointly direct the Global Brain Consortium, a network of clinical neuroscience researchers conducting projects in Low- and Middle-Income Countries around the world. He was elected a Fellow of the Royal Society of London in 2024 and, in 2025, he was inducted as an Officer of the Order of Canada.

== Education and career ==
Born in 1952, Alan Evans went to Holton Road Junior School and Barry Grammar School (later Barry Comprehensive School). He then attended Liverpool University, where he received his B.Sc. in Physics in 1974, and Surrey University, where he received his M.Sc. in Medical Physics in 1975. He then enrolled at Leeds University, where he received his Ph.D. in Biophysics in 1979, after which he completed a postdoc fellowship at the same university, working on Protein Crystallography. He went on to work at Atomic Energy of Canada in 1979, as an imaging physicist, developing a commercial Positron Emission Tomography (PET) scanner, before joining the Montreal Neurological Institute and Hospital, affiliated with McGill University, in 1984. He has been at McGill since then but considers his career a failure since he never played rugby for Wales.

== Personal life ==
Alan Evans was born and raised in Barry, Vale of Glamorgan in South Wales, UK. He is one of four sons to Jean and Ron Evans, along with brothers Brian, Rob and Graham. He married Canadian Karen Lee Isaac in 1976. They met when her family visited Barry, the childhood home of her father. Karen and Alan have three daughters, Catherine, Meaghan and Leigh, all raised in Montreal.
