= NeuroImage: Clinical =

- Discipline: Clinical neuroimaging
- Language: English
- Edited by: Andrew Zalesky

Publication details
- History: 2012-present
- Publisher: Elsevier
- Open access: Yes
- License: Authors can choose between Creative Commons By Attribution (BY) or Creative Commons by Attribution-NonCommercial-ShareAlike (BY-NC-SA)
- Impact factor: 4.891 (2021)

Standard abbreviations
- ISO 4: Neuroimage Clin.

Indexing
- ISSN: 2213-1582
- OCLC no.: 821222565

Links
- Journal homepage; Online access

NeuroImage: Clinical is a peer-reviewed open access medical journal covering clinical neuroimaging research. It was established in 2012 and is published by Elsevier as a sister journal to NeuroImage. The editor-in-chief is Andrew Zalesky. According to the Journal Citation Reports, the journal has a 2021 impact factor of 4.891.
