= Susan Y. Bookheimer =

American neuroscientist

- Education: Cornell University (BS); Wayne State University (PhD)
- Awards: OHBM Glass Brain Award
- Scientific career
- Fields: Clinical neuroscience
- Workplaces: Yale University; NIH; UCLA
- Thesis: Effects of spatial frequency, task demands, and unilateral brain injury on the recognition of faces (1989)
- Doctoral advisor: Russell Douglas Whitman

Susan Y. Bookheimer is a professor of clinical neuroscience at UCLA School of Medicine. She is best known for her work developing brain imaging techniques to help patients with Alzheimer's disease, autism, attention deficit hyperactivity disorder, brain tumors, and epilepsy.

== Achievements and awards ==
Bookheimer was the Chair of Organization for Human Brain Mapping in 2012–2013. In 2018 Bookheimer has received the Glass Brain lifetime achievement award presented by the Organization for Human Brain Mapping. She holds Joaquin M. Fuster Distinguished Professor position on Dept. Psychiatry and Biobehavioral Sciences, UCLA School of Medicine.

== Research ==
Bookheimer contributed to understanding of Alzheimer's disease by investigated a common polymorphism, APOE-4, a risk gene for Alzheimer's disease. Her work showed that normal volunteers who differ in their possession of the risk polymorphism had different brain activation patterns from APOE-4 carriers.

== Bibliography ==
- Bookheimer, Susan Y. (1989). Effects of spatial frequency, task demands, and unilateral brain injury on the recognition of faces (PhD thesis). Wayne State University. OCLC 21566717. ProQuest 303779999.
- Bookheimer, Susan Y.; Strojwas, Magdalena H.; Cohen, Mark S.; Saunders, Ann M.; Pericak-Vance, Margaret A.; Mazziotta, John C.; Small, Gary W. (2000-08-17). "Patterns of Brain Activation in People at Risk for Alzheimer's Disease". New England Journal of Medicine. 343 (7): 450–456. doi:10.1056/NEJM200008173430701. ISSN 0028-4793. PMC 2831477. PMID 10944562.
- Dapretto, Mirella; Hariri, Ahmad; Bialik, Mayim H.; Bookheimer, Susan Y. (1999). "Cortical correlates of affective vs. linguistic prosody: An fMRI study". NeuroImage. 9 (2): S1054. ISSN 1053-8119.
