= Cognition and Neuroergonomics Collaborative Technology Alliance =

US Army research program

The Cognition and Neuroergonomics (CaN) Collaborative Technology Alliance was a research program initiated, sponsored and partly performed by the U.S. Army Research Laboratory. The objective of the program was to "conduct research and development leading to the demonstration of fundamental translational principles of the application of neuroscience-based research and theory to complex operational settings. These principles will guide the development of technologies that work in harmony with the capabilities and limitations of the human nervous system."

Collaboration Technology and Research Alliances describe cooperative research and technology efforts between private industry, academia, and Army laboratories and centers. This collaboration allows Army researchers and engineers to join academic research developments and the industry's production abilities and translate them into improving Army capabilities.

== History ==
Major programs of interdisciplinary collaborations between the academic, private, and governmental sectors began at the Army Research Laboratory (ARL) in the 1990s. In 2010, the Cognition and Neuroergonomics (CaN) Collaborative Technology Alliance was launched and became one of four functioning ARL Collaboration Technology and Research Alliances at the time.

== Objectives ==
The CaN identified limitations in the field of cognitive neuroscience that needed attention. The limited conditions in a laboratory setting could not integrate the spans of physical and socio-cultural factors found in real world environments. Systems that monitor brain and body dynamics that are portable, robust, minimally invasive, and affordable have been underdeveloped. There were not enough software or mathematical models devoted to reporting variations in environment, behavior, and function in real time. The program sought to remedy these problems and leverage the solutions for the benefit of the soldier. CaN established the need for a new experimental environment where multisensory analysis can occur and wearable sensors that monitor brain and body dynamics. Additionally, it called for data sets and development of methods to allow for more in-depth characterization of behavior and variation in cognitive ability, performance, and personality.

== Research thrusts ==
Three primary research focuses were identified and pursued within the CaN program:

- Advanced Computational Approaches (ACA) was to develop methods to decode, monitor, and infer state from both neural and non-neural information. As research progressed, it focused on data from Large Scale Integrative experiments as well experimental data sets from the other two thrusts of the CaN CTA.
- Real World Neuroimaging (RWN) was to assist in studying the brain outside of the laboratory setting. Citation This branch has prioritized engineering and experimental studies with wireless dry electrodes EEG system. This emphasis was made to improve dry EEG systems' reliability and performance, determine standards of validity for them, and better understand their applications in real world neuroimaging. Another one of RWN's research concentrations was studying how stress and fatigue affect behavior in the real world.
- Brain Computer Interactions (BCI) was established to improve BCI technologies and improve human-robot communication. The poor robustness witnessed in many BCI technologies has been attributed to the ability of neural responses to change over time and that individuals may have different neural outputs to the same stimuli. BCI concentrated on using machine learning and developing an algorithm that would maintain a strong performance BCI technology's despite changes in an individual's mental state. Other example areas of interest were combining intelligent tutoring with BCI technologies, and improving human-robot communication via rapid series visual presentations with EEG.

== Results ==
Examples of research results developed by the CaN program include the following:

- The identification of a multifocal theta band indicating a loss of balance during a balance beam walking exercise. The knowledge of electrocortical indications for balance loss could allow for a better clinical assessment. Preventative measures could be made for those predisposed to falls who exhibit this neural behavior.
- A novel dry EEG electrode providing reliable results when applied to the scalp without any skin preparation. Researchers engineered this electrode to include a sensor-buffer effect, so that the application of force to the electrode against the scalp does not cause pain.
- Using fMRI and a novel network analysis algorithm, researchers witnessed autonomy in the sensorimotor cortex throughout the motor learning process. The rate of one's learning was due to personalized differences in the frontal and cingulate cortices.
- An SSVEP BCI computer spelling program was developed. The spelling program operated at 40 words per minute and at a relatively high information transfer rate.
- Electrocortical dynamics were studied in relation to isotonic and isometric lower limb muscle contractions. EEG in combination with an independent component analysis were used as a method of functional neuroimaging to better understand the relationship between muscle activity and electrocortical signals. This EEG/ICA system was reported to predict knee to ankle movements with 80% accuracy.
- Results concerning neural network control and brain structure reported the following. Densely connected areas, especially in the default mode system, have a large influence on the transition between cognitive states. Meanwhile, weakly connected areas, particularly in the executive function system, assist in transitioning to difficult-to-reach cognitive states. The integration of various cognitive systems is accomplished by areas of the brain at the boundaries of neural networks, particularly the attentive control systems.
- A filter bank CCA-based frequency detection analysis was used to improve the detection of SSVEPs. This CCA assisted in improving the speed of SSVEP-based BCI technology.
