= Budapest Reference Connectome =

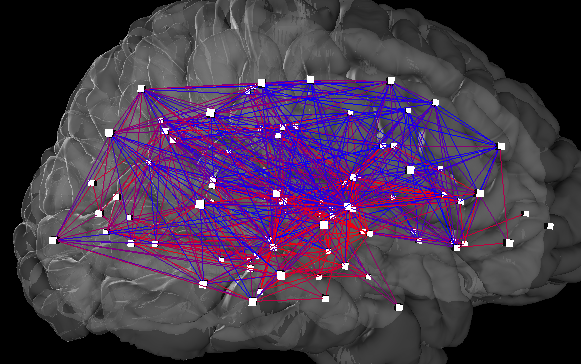
- Developers: Balázs Szalkai, Csaba Kerepesi, Bálint Varga, Vince Grolmusz
- Stable release: 3.0
- Written in: Perl, JavaScript, WebGL
- Available in: English
- Type: Connectomics
- Website: pitgroup.org/connectome/

The Budapest Reference Connectome server computes the frequently appearing anatomical brain connections of 418 healthy subjects. It has been prepared from diffusion MRI datasets of the Human Connectome Project into a reference connectome (or brain graph), which can be downloaded in CSV and GraphML formats and visualized on the site in 3D.

== Features ==
The Budapest Reference Connectome has 1015 nodes, corresponding to anatomically identified gray matter areas. The user can set numerous parameters and the resulting consensus connectome is readily visualized on the webpage. Users can zoom, rotate, and query the anatomical label of the nodes on the graphical component.

== Background ==
Budapest Reference Connectome is a consensus graph of the brain graphs of 96 subjects in Version 2 and 418 subjects in Version 3. Only those edges are returned which are present in a given percentage of the subjects. Each of the selected edges has a certain weight in each of the graphs containing that edge, so these multiple weights are combined into a single weight, by taking either their mean (i.e., average) or median. The user interface allows the customization of these parameters: the user can select the minimum frequency of the edges returned. There is an option for viewing and comparing the female or male reference connectomes. The connectomes of women contain significantly more edges than those of men, and a larger portion of the edges in the connectomes of women run between the two hemispheres.

== Discoveries ==
The Budapest Reference Connectome has led the researchers to the discovery of the Consensus Connectome Dynamics of the human brain graphs. The edges appeared in all of the brain graphs form a connected subgraph around the brainstem. By allowing gradually less frequent edges, this core subgraph grows continuously, as a shrub. The growth dynamics may reflect the individual brain development and provide an opportunity to direct some edges of the human consensus brain graph.
