= NeuroImage =

- Discipline: Neuroimaging, functional neuroimaging
- Language: English
- Edited by: Seth Levine, Bryony McGarry

Publication details
- History: 1993–present
- Publisher: Elsevier
- Frequency: 20/year
- Open access: Yes
- License: CC BY or CC BY-NC-ND
- Impact factor: 5.3 (2025)

Standard abbreviations
- ISO 4: NeuroImage

Indexing
- CODEN: NEIMEF
- ISSN: 1053-8119
- LCCN: sv94000005
- OCLC no.: 36950362

Links
- Journal homepage; Online access

NeuroImage is a peer-reviewed scientific journal covering research on neuroimaging, including functional neuroimaging and functional human brain mapping. The most recent editor-in-chief was Stephen Smith, until 2023. The journal drew attention in 2023 when all editors resigned after a dispute with the publisher, Elsevier, over publication fees.

Abstracts from the annual meeting of the Organization for Human Brain Mapping have been published as supplements to the journal. In 2012, Elsevier launched an open access sister journal to NeuroImage, entitled NeuroImage: Clinical.

== Abstracting and indexing ==
The journal is abstracted and indexed in Scopus, Science Citation Index Expanded, Current Contents/Life Sciences, and BIOSIS Previews. According to the Journal Citation Reports, the journal has a 2025 impact factor of 5.3.

== 2023 mass resignation ==
In April 2023, all editors of the journals NeuroImage and NeuroImage: Reports (more than 40 scientists) resigned, citing their regret for Elsevier's refusal to lower the journal's publication fee from $3,450 to under $2,000. On April 17, the former NeuroImage editorial team announced in an open letter the establishment of Imaging Neuroscience, a non-profit (APC currently $1,400) open access journal intended to replace NeuroImage as the leading journal in the field of neuroimaging.
