= Brain Imaging Data Structure =

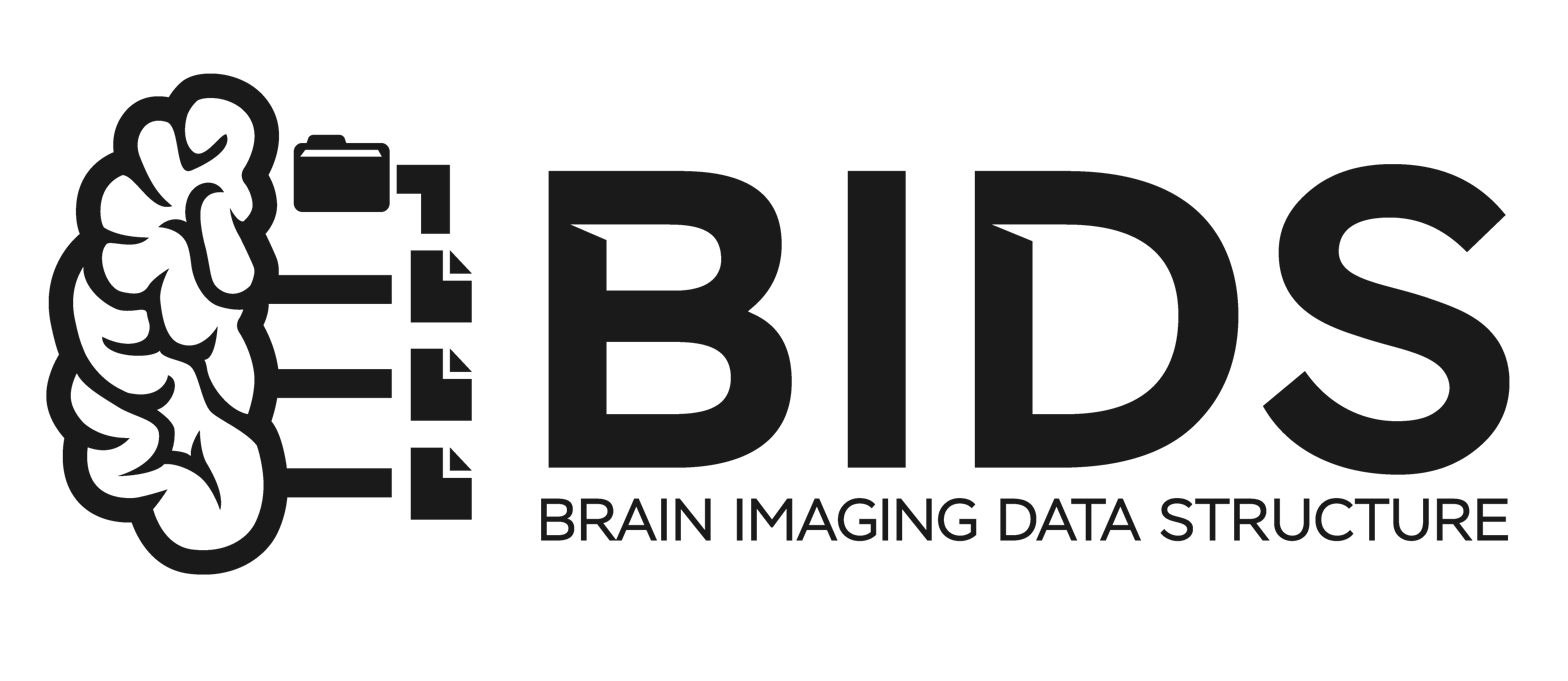
- Abbreviation: BIDS
- Status: Published
- Year started: 2015
- Latest version: 1.11.1; 2024-09-12
- Related standards: JSON, TSV, NIfTI
- Domain: Neuroimaging
- License: CC-BY 4.0
- Website: bids.neuroimaging.io

The Brain Imaging Data Structure (BIDS) is a standard for organizing, annotating, and describing data collected during neuroimaging experiments. It is based on a formalized file and directory structure and metadata files (based on JSON and TSV) with controlled vocabulary. This standard has been adopted by a multitude of labs around the world as well as databases such as OpenNeuro, SchizConnect, Developing Human Connectome Project, and FCP-INDI, and is seeing uptake in an increasing number of studies.

While originally specified for MRI data, BIDS has been extended to several other imaging modalities such as MEG, EEG, and intracranial EEG (see also BIDS Extension Proposals).

== History ==
The project is a community-driven effort. BIDS, originally OBIDS (Open Brain Imaging Data Structure), was initiated during an INCF sponsored data sharing working group meeting (January 2015) at Stanford University. It was subsequently spearheaded and maintained by Chris Gorgolewski. Since October 2019, the project is headed by a Steering Group and maintained by a separate team of maintainers, the Maintainers Group, according to a governance document that was approved of by the BIDS community in a vote. BIDS has advanced under the direction and effort of contributors, the community of researchers that appreciate the value of standardizing neuroimaging data to facilitate sharing and analysis.

== BIDS Extension Proposals ==
BIDS can be extended in a backwards compatible way and is evolving over time. This is accomplished through BIDS Extension Proposals (BEPs), which are community-driven processes following agreed-upon guidelines. A full list of finalized BEPs and BEPs in progress can be found on the BIDS website
