= Human Brain Mapping (journal) =

- Discipline: Neuroimaging, functional neuroimaging
- Language: English
- Edited by: Peter T. Fox, Jack L. Lancaster

Publication details
- History: 1993-present
- Publisher: John Wiley & Sons
- Frequency: Monthly
- Impact factor: 4.554 (2018)

Standard abbreviations
- ISO 4: Hum. Brain Mapp.

Indexing
- CODEN: HBMAEE
- ISSN: 1065-9471 (print); 1097-0193 (web)
- LCCN: 94648368
- OCLC no.: 474770986

Links
- Journal homepage; Online access; Online archive

Human Brain Mapping is a peer-reviewed scientific journal published by John Wiley & Sons covering research on human brain mapping.

According to the Journal Citation Reports, the journal has a 2014 impact factor of 5.969, ranking it second out of 14 journals in the category "Neuroimaging", fifth out of 125 journals in the category "Radiology Nuclear Medicine & Medical Imaging", and 27th out of 252 journals in the category "Neuroscience".
