= Event-related functional magnetic resonance imaging =

Event-related functional magnetic resonance imaging (efMRI) is a technique used in magnetic resonance imaging of medical patients.

EfMRI is used to detect changes in the BOLD (blood oxygen level dependent) hemodynamic response to neural activity in response to certain events.

== Description ==
Within fMRI methodology, there are two different ways that are typically employed to present stimuli. One method is a block related design, in which two or more different conditions are alternated in order to determine the differences between the two conditions, or a control may be included in the presentation occurring between the two conditions. By contrast, event related designs are not presented in a set sequence; the presentation is randomized and the time in between stimuli can vary.

efMRI attempts to model the change in fMRI signal in response to neural events associated with behavioral trials. According to D'Esposito, "event-related fMRI has the potential to address a number of cognitive psychology questions with a degree of inferential and statistical power not previously available."

Each trial can be composed of one experimentally controlled (such as the presentation of a word or picture) or a participant mediated "event" (such as a motor response). Within each trial, there are a number of events such as the presentation of a stimulus, delay period, and response. If the experiment is properly set up and the different events are timed correctly, efMRI allows a person to observe the differences in neural activity associated with each event.

== History ==
Positron emission tomography (PET), was the most frequently used brain mapping technique before the development of fMRI. There are a number of advantages that are presented in comparison to PET. According to D'Esposito, they include that fMRI "does not require an injection of radioisotope into participants and is otherwise noninvasive, has better spatial resolution, and has better temporal resolution."

The first MRI studies employed the use of "exogenous paramagnetic tracers to map changes in cerebral blood volume", which allowed for the assessment of brain activity over several minutes. This changed with two advancements to MRI, the rapidness of MRI techniques were increased to 1.5 tesla by the end of the 1980s, which provided a 2-d image. Next, endogenous contrast mechanisms were discovered by Detre, Koretsky, and colleagues was based on the net longitudinal magnetization within an organ, and a "second based on changes in the magnetic susceptibility induced by changing net tissue deoxyhemoglobin content", which has been labeled BOLD contrast by Siege Ogawa.

These discoveries served as inspiration for future brain mapping advancements. This allowed researchers to develop more complex types of experiments, going beyond observing the effects of single types of trials. When fMRI was developed one of its major limitations was the inability to randomize trials, but the event related fMRI fixed this problem. Cognitive subtraction was also an issue, which tried to correlate cognitive-behavioral differences between tasks with brain activity by pairing two tasks that are assumed to be matched perfectly for every sensory, motor, and cognitive process except the one of interest.

Next, a push for the improvement of temporal resolution of fMRI studies led to the development of event-related designs, which according to Peterson, was inherited from ERP research in electrophysiology, but it was discovered that this averaging did not apply very well to the hemodynamic response because the response from trials could overlap. As a result, random jittering of the events was applied, which meant that the time repetition was varied and randomized for the trials in order to ensure that the activation signals did not overlap.

== Hemodynamic response ==
In order to function, neurons require energy which is supplied by blood flow. Although it is not completely understood, the hemodynamic response has been correlated with neuronal activity, that is, as the activity level increases, the amount of blood used by neurons increases. This response takes several seconds to completely develop. Accordingly, fMRI has limited temporal resolution.

The hemodynamic response is the basis for the BOLD (blood oxygen level dependent) contrast in fMRI. The hemodynamic response occurs within seconds of the presented stimuli, but it is essential to space out the events in order to ensure that the response being measured is from the event that was presented and not from a prior event. Presenting stimuli in a more rapid sequence allows experimenters to run more trials and gather more data, but this is limited by the slow course of hemodynamic response, which generally must be allowed to return baseline before the presentation of another stimulus.

According to Burock "as the presentation rate increases in the random event related design, the variance in the signal increases thereby increasing the transient information and ability to estimate the underlying hemodynamic response".

== Rapid event-related efMRI ==
In a typical efMRI, after every trial the hemodynamic response is allowed to return to baseline. In rapid event-related fMRI, trials are randomized and the HRF is deconvolved afterwards. In order for this to be possible, every possible combination of trial sequences must be used and the inter-trial intervals jittered so that the time in between trials is not always the same.

== Advantages ==
1. Ability to randomize and mix different types of events, which ensures that one event is not influenced by others and not affected by the cognitive state of an individual, does not allow for predictability of events.
2. Events can be organized into categories after the experiment based on the subjects behavior
3. The occurrence of events can be defined by the subject
4. Sometimes the blocked event design cannot be applied to an event.
5. Treating stimuli, even when blocked, as separate events can potentially result in a more accurate model.
6. Rare events can be measured.

Chee argues that event related designs provide a number of advantages in language-related tasks, including the ability to separate correct and incorrect responses, and show task dependent variations in temporal response profiles.

== Disadvantages ==
1. More complex design and analysis.
2. Need to increase the number of trials because the MR signal is small.
3. Some events are better blocked.
4. Timing issues: sampling (fix: random jitter, varying the timing of the presentation of the stimuli, allows for a mean hemodynamic response to be calculated at the end).
5. Blocked designs have higher statistical power.
6. Easier to identify artifacts arising from non-physiologic signal fluctuations.

== Statistical analysis ==
In fMRI data, it is assumed that there is a linear relationship between neural stimulation and the BOLD response. The use of GLMs allows for the development of a mean to represent the mean hemodynamic response within the participants.

Statistical parametric mapping is used to produce a design matrix, which includes all of the different response shapes produced during the event. For more information on this, see Friston (1997).

== Applications ==
- Visual priming and object recognition
- Examining differences between parts of a task
- Changes over time
- Memory research – working memory using cognitive subtraction
- Deception – truth from lies
- Face perception
- Imitation learning
- Inhibition
- Stimulus specific responses

== Sources ==
- Buckner, M., Burock, M., Dale, A., Rosen, B., Woldorff, M. Randomized event-related experimental designs allow for extremely rapid presentation rates using functional MRI. (1998) NeuroReport. 19. 3735–3739.
- Buckner, R. Event-Related fMRI and the Hemodynamic Response. (1998). Human Brain Mapping. 6. 373–377.
- Buckner, R., Dale, A., Rosen, B. Event-Related functional MRI:Past, Present and Future. (1998). Proc. Natl. Acad. Sci. USA. 95. 773–780.
- Chee, M. Siong, S., Venkatraman, V., Westphal, C. Comparison of Block and Event-Related fMRI Designs in Evaluating the Word-Frequency Effect. (2003). Human Brain Mapping. 18. 186–193.
- Dale, A., Friston, K., Henson, R., Josephs, O., Zarahn, E. Stochastic Designs in Event-Related fMRI. (1999). NeuroImage. 10. 607-6-19.
- D'Esposito, M., Zarahn, E., & Aguirre, G. K. (1999). Event-related functional MRI: Implications for cognitive psychology. Psychological Bulletin, 125(1). 155–164.
- Dubis, J. Petersen, S. The Mized block/event-related design. (2011). NeuroImage. doi 10.1016/j.neuroimage.2011.09.084.
- Friston, K., Josephs, O., Turner, R. Event-Related fMRI. (1997). Human Brain Mapping. 5. 243–248.
- Henson, R. Event-related fMRI: Introduction, Statistical Modelling, Design Optimization and Examples. University College London. Paper to be presented at the 5th Congress of the Cognitive Neuroscience Society of Japan.
