= Signal enhancement by extravascular water protons =

Contrast mechanism for functional magnetic resonance imaging

Signal enhancement by extravascular water protons, or SEEP, is a contrast mechanism for functional magnetic resonance imaging (fMRI), which is an alternative to the more commonly employed BOLD (blood-oxygen-level dependent) contrast. This mechanism for image contrast changes corresponding to changes in neuronal activity was first proposed by Dr. Patrick Stroman in 2001. SEEP contrast is based on changes in tissue water content which arise from the increased production of extracellular fluid and swelling of neurons and glial cells at sites of neuronal activity. Because the dominant sources of MRI signal in biological tissues are water and lipids, an increase in tissue water content is reflected by a local increase in MR signal intensity. A correspondence between BOLD and SEEP signal changes, and sites of activity, has been observed in the brain and appears to arise from the common dependence on changes in local blood flow to cause a change in blood oxygenation or to produce extracellular fluid. The advantage of SEEP contrast is that it can be detected with MR imaging methods which are relatively insensitive to magnetic susceptibility differences between air, tissues, blood, and bone. Such susceptibility differences can give rise to spatial image distortions and areas of low signal, and magnetic susceptibility changes in blood give rise to the BOLD contrast for fMRI. The primary application of SEEP to date has been fMRI of the spinal cord (spinal fMRI) because the bone/tissue interfaces around the spinal cord cause poor image quality with conventional fMRI methods. The disadvantages of SEEP compared to BOLD contrast are that it reveals more localized areas of activity, and in the brain the signal intensity changes are typically lower, and it can therefore be more difficult to detect.

== Controversy ==
SEEP is controversial because it is not universally agreed to exist as a contrast mechanism for fMRI. However, more recent studies have demonstrated changes in MRI signal corresponding with changes in neuronal activity in rat cortical tissue slices, in the absence of blood flow or changes in oxygenation, and neuronal activity and cellular swelling were corroborated by light-transmittance microscopy. This demonstrated SEEP contrast in the absence of confounding factors which can occur in-vivo, such as physiological motion and the possibility of concurrent BOLD contrast.
