= France Life Imaging =

French research organisation

- FLI
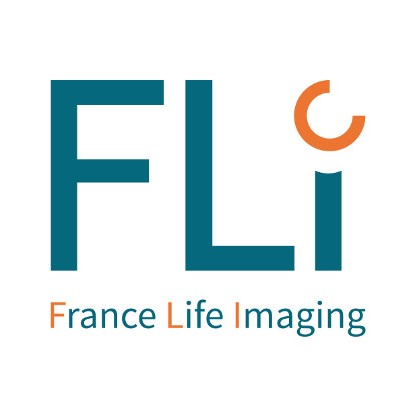
- Headquarters: Saclay, France, 48°43′26.2″N 2°09′17.1″E
- Official languages: French
- Website: francelifeimaging.fr;

France Life Imaging (FLI) is a state-funded organization in biomedical imaging established in 2012 in Saclay, France. It facilitates support and cooperation between research institutes, academic departments and industry in biomedical imaging.

== History ==
In 2010, the French government created the multi-year funding program known as PIA to bear and reduce the cost of medical equipment for research units. From 2012 onwards, FLI has been in charge of the promotion and access of technologies in biomedical imaging, services packages for network members, industry, academic and clinical partners.

== Activities ==
More than 160 platforms build the core of FLI of which two thirds are dedicated to preclinical imaging and the rest to clinical imaging. Through FLI, partners can list, finance and facilitate access to imaging systems, such as photon counting computed tomography, clinical MRI at 7 tesla, PET-MRI, high spatial and temporal resolution ultrasound (Functional Ultrasound).

=== Publications ===
All source codes produced by FLI-IAM has been released under open source license.

== Governance ==
FLI is managed by the CEA on the CEA Paris-Saclay campus with a distributed governance mode. The organization works jointly with various governing bodies including the universities of Paris-Saclay, Grenoble Alpes, Aix-Marseille University, Claude Bernard Lyon I, Paris Cité , Paul Sabatier-Toulouse III, the universities of Bordeaux, Montpellier, Nancy, Nantes, Rennes and Strasbourg as well as the main research organisations, INSERM, CNRS and INRIA.

== Nodes ==
FLI has hub nodes in the following regions:

- FLI Paris South;
- FLI Paris Center;
- FLI Bordeaux;
- FLI Grenoble;
- FLI Lyon;
- FLI Marseille;
- FLI Grand West;
- FLI Grand Est;
- FLI Nord ouest;
- FLI Occitan;
- FLI IAM.
