= Electroencephalography functional magnetic resonance imaging =

EEG-fMRI (short for EEG-correlated fMRI or electroencephalography-correlated functional magnetic resonance imaging) is a multimodal neuroimaging technique whereby EEG and fMRI data are recorded synchronously for the study of electrical brain activity in correlation with haemodynamic changes in brain during the electrical activity, be it normal function or associated with disorders.

== Principle ==
Scalp EEG reflects the brain's electrical activity, and in particular post-synaptic potentials (see Inhibitory postsynaptic current and Excitatory postsynaptic potential) in the cerebral cortex, whereas fMRI is capable of detecting haemodynamic changes throughout the brain through the BOLD effect. EEG-fMRI therefore allows measuring both neuronal and haemodynamic activity which comprise two important components of the neurovascular coupling mechanism.

== Methodology ==
The simultaneous acquisition of EEG and fMRI data of sufficient quality requires solutions to problems linked to potential health risks (due to currents induced by the MR image forming process in the circuits created by the subject and EEG recording system) and EEG and fMRI data quality. There are two degrees of integration of the data acquisition, reflecting technical limitations associated with the interference between the EEG and MR instruments. These are: interleaved acquisitions, in which each acquisition modality is interrupted in turn (periodically) to allow data of adequate quality to be recorded by the other modality; continuous acquisitions, in which both modalities are able to record data of adequate quality continuously. The latter can be achieved using real-time or post-processing EEG artifact reduction software. EEG was first recorded in an MR environment around 1993. Several groups have found independent means to solve the problems of mutual contamination of the EEG and fMRI signals. The first continuous EEG-fMRI experiment was performed in 1999 using a numerical filtering approach. A predominantly software-based method was implemented shortly thereafter. An addition to EEG-fMRI set up is the simultaneous and synchronized video recording without affecting the EEG and fMRI data quality.

For the most part, the acquisition of concurrent EEG-fMRI data is now treated as a solved problem, and commercial devices are available from major manufacturers (e.g., Electrical Geodesics, Inc.; NeuroScan/Compumedics, Inc.; Brain Products; Advanced Neuro Technology), but issues remain. For example, there are significant residual artifacts in the EEG that occur with each heartbeat. The traces in the EEG that record this are often referred to as a, "Ballistocardiogram (BCG)," because of their presumed origin in the motion of the EEG leads in the magnetic field that occurs with each heartbeat.

A number of methods have been developed to remove the BCG artifact from concurrent EEG-fMRI signals. The majority of early methods were based on manual identification of noise components using independent component analysis. However, more recent methods use low-rank sparse decomposition (LRSD) which automatically identifies noise components and results in a more thorough "scrubbing" of the BCG noise

== Applications ==
In principle, the technique combines the EEG’s well documented ability to characterise certain brain states with high temporal resolution and to reveal pathological patterns, with fMRI’s (more recently discovered and less well understood) ability to image blood dynamics through the entire brain with high spatial resolution. Up to now, EEG-fMRI has been mainly seen as an fMRI technique in which the synchronously acquired EEG is used to characterise brain activity (‘brain state’) across time allowing to map (through statistical parametric mapping, for example) the associated haemodynamic changes.

The initial motivation for EEG-fMRI was in the field of research into epilepsy, and in particular the study of interictal epileptiform discharges (IED, or interictal spikes), and their generators, and of seizures. IED are unpredictable and sub-clinical events in patients with epilepsy that can only be observed using EEG (or MEG). Therefore, recording EEG during fMRI acquisition allows the study of their haemodynamic correlates. The method can reveal haemodynamic changes linked to IED and seizures, and has proven a powerful scientific tool. The simultaneous and synchronized video recording identifies clinical seizure activity along with electrophysiological activity on EEG, which helps to investigate, correlated haemodynamic changes in brain during seizures.

The clinical value of these findings is the subject of ongoing investigations, but recent researches suggest an acceptable reliability for EEG-fMRI studies and better sensitivity in higher field scanner. Outside the field of epilepsy, EEG-fMRI has been used to study event-related (triggered by external stimuli) brain responses and provided important new insights into baseline brain activity during resting wakefulness and sleep.
