= Linear transform model (MRI) =

The linear transform model refers to a fundamental assumption guiding the analysis of functional Magnetic Resonance Imaging (fMRI) studies. Specifically, the model holds that the fMRI signal is approximately proportional to a measure of local neural activity, averaged over a spatial extent of several millimeters and over a time period of several seconds.

== Debate ==
The linear transform model is a common and widespread assumption used in the interpretation of fMRI studies. However, some scientists suggest reasons exist to remain sceptical. Heeger and Ress, in a review of fMRI and its relation to neuronal activity, argue that it is a reasonable and useful approximation for local neural activity "for some recording sites, in some brain areas, using certain experimental protocols", but it is not under other circumstances.

== See also ==
- Functional magnetic resonance imaging
