= Spinal fMRI =

Functional magnetic resonance imaging of the spinal cord

Functional magnetic resonance imaging (fMRI) of the spinal cord (spinal fMRI) is an adaptation of the fMRI method that has been developed for use in the brain. Although the basic principles underlying the methods are the same, spinal fMRI requires a number of specific adaptations to accommodate the periodic motion of the spinal cord, the small cross-sectional dimensions (roughly 8 mm × 15 mm at the largest region) and length (~45 cm in adult humans) of the spinal cord, and the fact that the magnetic field that is used for MRI varies with position in the spinal cord because of magnetic susceptibility differences between bone and tissues. Spinal fMRI has been used to produce maps of neuronal activity at most levels of the spinal cord in response to various stimuli, such as touch, vibration, and thermal changes, and with motor tasks. Research applications of spinal fMRI to date include studies of normal sensory and motor function, pain processing, and studies of the effects of trauma and multiple sclerosis on the spinal cord.

Two different data acquisition methods have been applied, both based on the established BOLD (blood-oxygenation-level dependent) fMRI methods used in the brain. The majority of the studies published to date are based on T2-weighted BOLD methods (Figure 1). This change from standard brain fMRI methods is to avoid the use of echo-planar imaging (EPI) for spatial encoding. EPI methods suffer from severe spatial distortions in the lower brainstem and spinal cord, and require relatively small acquisition matrices which result in low signal-to-noise ratio. In addition, the use of T2*-weighted methods, as is common for brain fMRI, produces highly variable results in the non-uniform magnetic field environment in the lower brainstem and spinal cord. A number of fMRI studies have reported function in the cervical spinal cord using T2*-weighted EPI methods. However, the data required specialized methods to correct spatial distortions and signal loss, and the results were shown to suffer from problems with reproducibility. By avoiding EPI, single-shot fast spin-echo methods such as HASTE can provide high-quality BOLD fMRI data without spatial distortions and with higher signal-to-noise ratios, and fMRI data can be acquired in sagittal slices in order to span a large extent of the spinal cord. Large volume coverage enables more accurate spatial localization and identification of connectivity between spinal cord and brainstem regions. The cost of the higher quality of fast spin-echo methods such as HASTE is that they are slower than EPI methods. However, fMRI methods can be designed to compensate for the lower speed because BOLD responses are also slow .
