= Neurovascular unit =

Brain parts regulating brain blood flow

The neurovascular unit (NVU) comprises the components of the brain that collectively regulate cerebral blood flow in order to deliver the necessary nutrients to activated neurons. The NVU addresses the brain's unique dilemma of having high energy demands yet low energy storage capacity. In order to function properly, the brain must receive glucose for energy metabolism in specific areas, quantities, and times. Unlike muscle cells, which can deplete and later replenish their energy reserves, neurons require a continuous, real-time supply of energy. The neurovascular unit facilitates this delivery as needed, ensuring that cerebral metabolism is sustained and neuronal activity can continue seamlessly.

The neurovascular unit consists of neurons, astrocytes, vasculature (endothelial and vascular mural cells), the vasomotor apparatus (smooth muscle cells and pericytes), and microglia. Together, these function in the homeostatic haemodynamic response of cerebral hyperaemia. Cerebral hyperaemia is a fundamental central nervous system homeostatic mechanism that increases blood supply to neural tissue when necessary. This mechanism regulates local perfusion through a multidimensional process involving the various cells of the neurovascular unit and signaling molecules. By interacting, these components of the NVU sense the neurons' needs for oxygen and glucose and trigger the appropriate vasodilatory or vasoconstrictive responses. Through this process, known as neurovascular coupling, neurons and astrocytes can modulate cerebral blood flow. Thus, the NVU provides the structural and cellular framework underlying neurovascular coupling, linking neuronal activity to cerebral blood flow and reflecting the interdependence of their development, structure, and function.

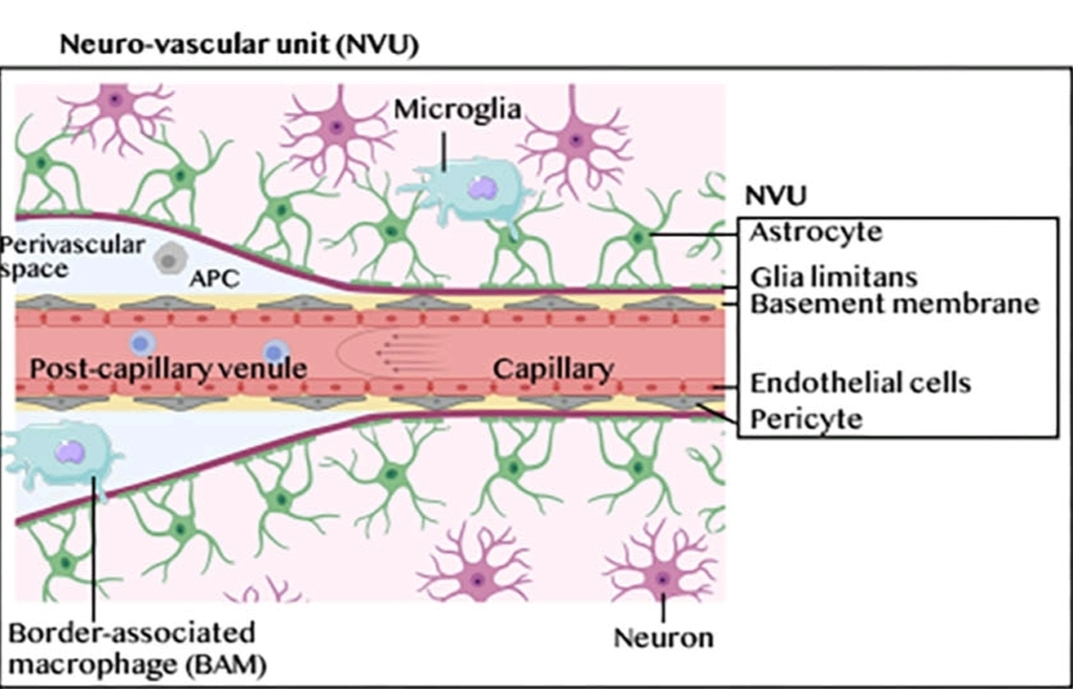
A schematic of the neurovascular unit (NVU), where astrocyte processes surround the capillary basement membrane and pericytes, creating the glia limitans. Also, resident in the perivascular space are antigen-presenting cells (APCs) and border-associated macrophages (BAMs).

The neurovascular unit was formalized as a concept in 2001, at the inaugural Stroke Progress Review Group of the National Institute of Neurological Disorders and Stroke (NINDS). In prior years, the importance of both neurons and cerebral vasculature was well known; however, their interconnected relationship was not. The two were long considered distinct entities which, for the most part, operated independently. Since 2001, though, the rapid increase of scientific papers citing the neurovascular unit represents the growing understanding of the interactions that occur between the brain's cells and blood vessels.

Due to the tight temporal and spatial coupling of cerebral blood flow to neuronal activity, measuring blood flow serves as an accurate proxy for brain function. Neuroimaging techniques that directly or indirectly monitor blood flow, such as fMRI and PET scans, can thus measure and locate activity in the brain with precision. Imaging of the brain also allows researchers to better understand the neurovascular unit and its many complexities.

The neurons' dependence on continuous blood flow additionally makes them highly vulnerable to vascular disruptions. Any impediments that prevent neurons from receiving the appropriate nutrients can cause an array of neurological pathologies. For example, a complete stoppage for only a few minutes, potentially caused by arterial occlusion or heart failure, can result in permanent neuronal damage and cell death. Dysfunction in the NVU is also associated with neurodegenerative diseases including Alzheimer's and Huntington's disease.

== Function ==
=== Anatomical components ===
The neurovascular unit consists of vascular cells (including endothelium, pericytes, and smooth muscle cells), glia (astrocytes and microglia), and neurons with synaptic junctions for signaling. The cerebral vascular network consists of surface pial arteries that branch into penetrating arterioles within the brain parenchyma. Surrounding these vessels is the perivascular compartment, which houses immune and scavenger cells such as perivascular macrophages, Mato cells, pial cells, and mast cells. Cerebral blood flow through this system is facilitated by the major neck arteries. Segmented vascular resistance, or the amount of flow control that each section of the brain maintains, is measured as the ratio of the blood pressure gradient to blood flow volume. The vascular network within the NVU acts as a low-resistance channel that allows blood to be distributed to different parts of the brain. Within this system, the cells of the NVU sense the metabolic needs of neural tissue and release mediators that trigger the vascular smooth muscle cells to alter blood flow through vasodilation or vasoconstriction. Additionally, smooth muscle cells regulate flow via effector systems such as the myogenic effect, an inherent mechanical response where they constrict or dilate based on changes in intravascular pressure. Together, this is recognized as a multidimensional response that operates across the cerebrovascular network as a whole.

=== Blood–brain barrier ===
The cells of the neurovascular unit also collectively form the blood–brain barrier (BBB), which plays an essential role in maintaining the microenvironment of the brain. The blood–brain barrier is a highly selective semipermeable membrane that controls the transport of ions, molecules, and cells between the blood and the central nervous system. The barrier strictly filters out neurotoxins and pathogens that may cause inflammation, injury, or disease, while mediating the active transport of nutrients.

Encompassed within the BBB are specialized endothelial cells, pericytes, a capillary basement membrane, and astrocyte endfeet. Endothelial cells line the interior vessels and form tight junctions to restrict permeability. The tight junctions serve as the main impediment to drug delivery in the brain. Pericytes exist on the abluminal surface of this endothelial layer and are embedded within the basement membrane. They release signaling factors that determine the number of endothelial tight junctions to maintain the structural integrity and permeability of the barrier. A reduction in pericytes directly correlates with a loss of these tight junctions, leading to increased barrier permeability. Similarly, astrocytes secrete growth factors that directly induce endothelial tight junctions, and they also metabolize blood glucose into lactate for neuronal energy.

=== Neurovascular coupling ===
Neuronal activity carries a high metabolic demand, requiring continuous, targeted delivery of glucose and oxygen via cerebral blood flow. To meet this demand, the NVU modulates local perfusion through neurovascular coupling (NVC), or functional hyperemia. When neurons fire action potentials and consume ATP, local blood flow immediately increases to compensate. This rapid response relies on a feedforward mechanism, triggered directly by neurotransmitter signaling.

Synaptic glutamate release activates receptors on both neurons and astrocytes, driving an increase in intracellular calcium. This calcium influx triggers distinct vasoactive cascades, prompting neurons to produce nitric oxide and adenosine, and astrocytes to release potassium ions and vasodilatory arachidonic acid metabolites. These signaling molecules are detected by local pericytes and capillaries. Endothelial cells then retroactively propagate the vasodilatory signal upstream through gap junctions, causing smooth muscle cells to relax and increase blood flow to the active brain region.

== Imaging ==
Neurovascular coupling enables imaging techniques to measure neuronal activity by tracking blood flow. Various other types of neuroimaging also allow the NVU itself to be studied, providing visual insights into the complex interactions between neurons, glial cells, and blood vessels in the brain.

=== Fluorescence microscopy ===
Fluorescence microscopy is a widely used imaging technique that utilizes fluorescent probes to visualize specific molecules or structures within the neurovascular unit. It allows researchers to label and track cellular components, such as neurons, astrocytes, and blood vessel markers, with high specificity. Fluorescence imaging offers excellent spatial resolution, allowing for detailed visualization of cellular morphology and localized molecular interactions. By using different fluorophores, researchers can simultaneously examine multiple cellular components and molecular pathways of the neurovascular unit. However, limited tissue penetration depth, photobleaching, and phototoxicity negatively impact the potential for long-term imaging studies.

=== Electron microscopy ===
Electron microscopy provides details of the neurovascular unit at the nanometer scale by using a focused beam of electrons instead of light, enabling higher resolution imaging. Transmission electron microscopy images thin tissue sections, providing detailed information about the fine cellular structures, including astrocytic endfeet, gap junctions, and synaptic clefts. Scanning electron microscopy, on the other hand, provides 3D information by scanning a focused electron beam across the sample's surface, allowing for the visualization of the topography of neurovascular unit components. Electron microscopy techniques are, thus, invaluable for studying the precise cellular and subcellular interactions within the NVU. However, it requires sample preparation involving fixation, dehydration, and staining, which can introduce artifacts, and it is not suitable for live or large-scale imaging due to its time-consuming nature.

=== Magnetic resonance imaging ===
Magnetic resonance imaging (MRI) is a non-invasive imaging technique that uses strong magnetic fields and radio waves to generate detailed images of the brain's anatomy and function. It can provide information about blood flow, oxygenation levels, and structural characteristics of the neurovascular unit. The functional MRI (fMRI) allows researchers to study brain activity by measuring changes in blood oxygenation associated with neural activity, thus classifying it as a blood-oxygen-level-dependent imaging (BOLD imaging) technique. Diffusion MRI (dMRI) provides insights into the brain's structural connectivity by tracking the diffusion of water molecules in its tissue. MRI, in general, has excellent spatial resolution and can be used for both human and animal studies, making it a valuable tool for studying the neurovascular unit in vivo. It has limited temporal resolution, though, and its ability to visualize finer cellular and molecular details within the neurovascular unit is relatively lower compared to microscopy techniques.

=== Optical coherence tomography ===
Optical coherence tomography (OCT) is an imaging technique that utilizes low-coherence interferometry to generate high-resolution cross-sectional images of biological tissues. It can, thus, provide information about the microstructure and vascular network of the neurovascular unit. More specifically, OCT has been used to study cerebral blood flow dynamics, changes in vessel diameter, and blood–brain barrier integrity. It also has real-time imaging capabilities and can, thus, be effectively applied in both clinical and preclinical settings. Downsides of optical coherence tomography include limited depth penetration in highly scattering tissues and a lower resolution in increasing depth, which can limit its application in deep brain regions.

== Clinical significance ==
=== Neurovascular failure ===
Neurovascular failure, or neurovascular disease, refers to a range of conditions that negatively affect the function of blood vessels in the brain and spinal cord. While the exact cellular and molecular mechanisms behind neurovascular disease are not fully understood, the etiology is multifactorial and risk is significantly elevated by genetic predispositions, age, poor lifestyle choices, genetic changes during pregnancy, physical trauma, and modifiable cardiovascular risk factors (ischemic and hemorrhagic stroke, chronic hypertension, atherosclerosis, hyperlipidemia, and diabetes). In particular, neurovascular failure can be caused by problems arising in the blood vessels, including blockages (embolism), clot formation (thrombosis), narrowing (stenosis), loss of microvascular density (vascular rarefaction) and rupture (hemorrhage).

Tissue hypoxia is one of the main triggers that impairs signaling pathways involved in neurovascular coupling. In response to low oxygen, astrocytes stabilize hypoxia-inducible factor-1 alpha (HIF-1α), which in turn upregulates pro-inflammatory cytokines, glucose transporters, and pro-angiogenic factors. Neuronal injury is often preceded by the expression and release of these pro-angiogenic factors, such as vascular endothelial growth factor (VEGF), which signal the formation of new blood vessels. In chronic cerebrovascular disease, instead of forming functional vascular networks, excessive VEGF production and the upregulation of endothelial receptors stimulate abnormal cellular proliferation, degrading endothelial tight junctions and resulting in the hyperpermeability of the BBB. Concurrently, pro-inflammatory cytokines recruit leukocytes that degrade the BBB via matrix metalloproteinase release. Ultimately, vascular dysfunction results in decreased cerebral blood flow and abnormalities in the blood–brain barrier, which poses a threat to the normal functioning of the brain.
