= Haemodynamic response =

Physiological process

The canonical haemodynamic response function (HRF). The spike indicates a brief intense period of neuron stimulation, which requires increased blood and nutrient flow. As the needs of the neuronal activity are met, blood flow returns to homeostatic levels.

In haemodynamics, the body must respond to physical activities, external temperature, and other factors by homeostatically adjusting its blood flow to deliver nutrients such as oxygen and glucose to stressed tissues and allow them to function. Haemodynamic response (HR) allows the rapid delivery of blood to active neuronal tissues. The brain consumes large amounts of energy but does not have a reservoir of stored energy substrates. Since higher processes in the brain occur almost constantly, cerebral blood flow is essential for the maintenance of neurons, astrocytes, and other cells of the brain. The coupling between neuronal activity and blood flow is neurovascular coupling.

== Vascular anatomy overview ==
In order to understand how blood is delivered to cranial tissues, it is important to understand the vascular anatomy of the space itself. Large cerebral arteries in the brain split into smaller arterioles, also known as pial arteries. These consist of endothelial cells and smooth muscle cells, and as these pial arteries further branch and run deeper into the brain, they associate with glial cells, namely astrocytes. The intracerebral arterioles and capillaries are unlike systemic arterioles and capillaries in that they do not readily allow substances to diffuse through them; they are connected by tight junctions in order to form the blood brain barrier (BBB). Endothelial cells, smooth muscle, neurons, astrocytes, and pericytes work together in the brain order to maintain the BBB while still delivering nutrients to tissues and adjusting blood flow in the intracranial space to maintain homeostasis. As they work as a functional neurovascular unit, alterations in their interactions at the cellular level can impair HR in the brain and lead to deviations in normal nervous function.

== Mechanisms ==
Various cell types play a role in HR, including astrocytes, smooth muscle cells, endothelial cells of blood vessels, and pericytes. These cells control whether the vessels are constricted or dilated, which dictates the amount of oxygen and glucose that is able to reach the neuronal tissue.

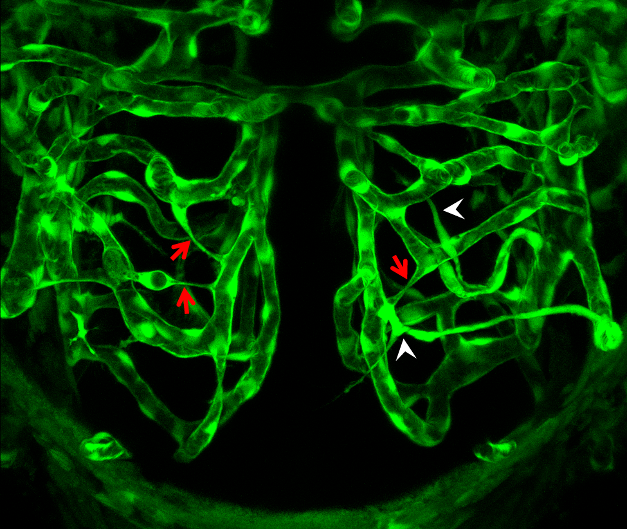
Brain blood vasculature as a function of blood flow. Red arrows show vascular pruning, while white arrowheads indicate vessel widening in response to increased blood flow.

=== Astrocytes ===
Astrocytes are unique in that they are intermediaries that lie between blood vessels and neurons. They are able to communicate with other astrocytes via gap junctions and have endfoot processes that interact with neuronal synapses. These processes have the ability to take up various neurotransmitters, such as norepinephrine (NE) and glutamate, and perform various other functions to maintain chemical and electrical homeostasis in the neuronal environment.

Constriction has been shown in vitro to occur when NE is placed in the synapse and is taken up by astrocyte receptors. NE uptake leads to an increase in intracellular astrocyte Ca^{2+}. When these calcium ion waves spread down the length of the astrocyte, phospholipase A (PLA_{2}) is activated which in turn mobilizes arachidonic acid. These two compounds are transported to the smooth muscle and there react with cytochrome P450 to make 20-hydroxyeicosatetraenoic acid (20-HETE), which acts through yet to-be-determined mechanisms to induce vasoconstriction. It has also been shown that agonists of metabotropic glutamate receptors (mGluR) also increase intracellular Ca^{2+} to produce constriction.

=== Smooth muscle ===
Dilation occurs when nitric oxide (NO) is released from endothelial cells and diffuses into nearby vascular smooth muscle. Several proposed pathways of NO-induced vasodilation have been proposed through haemodynamic investigation. It has been shown that NO inhibits 20-HETE synthesis, which may interfere with astrocytes' constriction pathways and lead to vasodilation. It has also been proposed that NO may amplify astrocyte Ca^{2+} influx and activate Ca^{2+}-dependent potassium channels, releasing K^{+} into the interstitial space and inducing hyperpolarization of smooth muscle cells. In addition to this, it has already been shown that NO stimulates increased cyclic GMP (cGMP) levels in the smooth muscle cells, inducing a signaling cascade that results in the activation of cGMP-dependent protein kinase (PKG) and an ultimate decrease in smooth muscle Ca^{2+} concentration. This leads to a decrease in muscle contraction and a subsequent dilation of the blood vessel. Whether the vessels are constricted or dilated dictates the amount of oxygen and glucose that is able to reach the neuronal tissue.

=== Pericytes ===
A principal function of pericytes is to interact with astrocytes, smooth muscle cells, and other intracranial cells to form the blood brain barrier and to modulate the size of blood vessels to ensure proper delivery and distribution of oxygen and nutrients to neuronal tissues. Pericytes have both cholinergic (α2) and adrenergic (β2) receptors. Stimulation of the latter leads to vessel relaxation, while stimulation of the cholinergic receptors leads to contraction.

Paracrine activity and oxygen availability have been shown to also modulate pericyte activity. The peptides angiotensin II and endothelin-1 (ET-1) bind to pericytes and are vasoactive. Endothelial cells induce expression of endothelin-1, which leads to NO production and vasodilation. Experiments have demonstrated that oxygen levels also alter pericyte contraction and subsequent blood vessel contraction. In vitro, high oxygen concentrations cause pericyte constriction, while high CO_{2} concentrations cause relaxation. This suggests that pericytes may have the ability to dilate blood vessels when oxygen is in demand and constrict them when it is in surplus, modifying the rate of blood flow to tissues depending on their metabolic activity.

== Complications ==
The haemodynamic response is rapid delivery of blood to active neuronal tissue. Complications in this response arise in acute coronary syndromes and pulmonary arterial hypertension. These complications lead to a change in the regulation of blood flow to the brain, and in turn the amount of glucose and oxygen that is supplied to neurons, which may have serious effects not only on the functioning of the nervous system, but functioning of all bodily systems.

=== Acute coronary syndrome ===
Acute infections, such as community-acquired pneumonia (CAP), act as a trigger for acute coronary syndromes (ACS). ACS deals with symptoms that result from the obstruction of coronary arteries. Due to this obstruction there are thrombotic complications at the sites of atherosclerotic plaques. The most common symptom that prompts diagnosis is chest pain, associated with nausea and sweating. Treatment usually includes aspirin, Clopidogrel, nitroglycerin, and if chest pain persists morphine. Recent study suggests that acute respiratory tract infection can act as a trigger for ACS. This in turn has major prothrombotic and haemodynamic effects.

These effects result from coagulation, which is normally prevented in the vascular endothelium by expression of antithrombotic factors on its surface. Sepsis, which causes disruption and apoptosis of endothelial cells results in the endothelium switching to a procoagulant phenotype. This promotes platelet adhesion and aggregation. Moreover, only once disruption of the plaque surface has occurred are these prothrombotic effects likely to be significant in the pathogenesis of ACS. Sepsis is also largely associated with haemodynamic changes. Coronary artery perfusion pressure is reduced in peripheral vasodilation, which results in reduced blood pressure and reduced myocardial contractility. Endothelial dysfunction induces coronary vasoconstriction. This is caused by catecholamine release and by infections. Severe infections lead to increase myocardial metabolic demands and hypoxia. When neuronal tissue is deprived of adequate oxygen, the haemodynamic response has less of an effect at active neuronal tissue. All of these disturbances increase the likelihood of ACS, due to coronary plaque rupture and thrombosis. Overall, ACS results from the damage of coronaries by atherosclerosis, so primary prevention of ACS is to prevent atherosclerosis by controlling risk factors. This includes eating healthy, exercising regularly, and controlling cholesterol levels.

=== Pulmonary arterial hypertension ===
Pulmonary hypertension (PAH) is disease of small pulmonary arteries that is usually caused by more than one mechanism. This includes pneumonia, parasitic infections, street drugs, such as cocaine and methamphetamines that cause constriction of blood vessels, and many more. Vasoactive mediators, such as nitric oxide and prostacyclin, along with overexpression of vasoconstrictors not only affect vascular tone but also promote vascular remodeling. PAH deals with increase blood pressure in pulmonary arteries, which leads to shortness of breath, dizziness, fainting, rarely hemoptysis, and many other symptoms. PAH can be a severe disease, which may lead to decreased exercise tolerance, and ultimately heart failure. It involves vasoconstrictions of blood vessels connected to and within the lungs. As a result, the heart has a hard time pumping blood through the lungs, and the blood vessels eventually undergoes fibrosis. The increased workload on the heart causes hypertrophy of the right ventricle, which leads less blood being pump through the lungs and decreased blood to the left side of the heart. As a result of all of this, the left side of the heart has a hard time pumping a sufficient supply of oxygen to the rest of the body, which deteriorates the effect of the haemodynamic response. Impaired haemodynamic responses in turn diminish exercise capacity in patients with PAH. The severity of haemodynamic dysfunction during progressive exercise in PAH can be recorded using cardiopulmonary exercise testing (CPET), and/or impedance cardiography (ICG). Furthermore, there are no current cures for pulmonary arterial hypertension, but there are treatment options for patients with the disease to help prolong their survival and quality of life. A few of these treatments include basic therapy, calcium-channel blockers, and prostacyclin therapy. Basic therapy can lead to dramatic clinical improvements in patients with right heart failure by instituting diuretic therapy. This reduces the right ventricular preload. Moreover, high-dose calcium-channel blockers among patients who have a response to this treatment can prolong survival and improve pulmonary haemodynamics. Calcium channel blocking drugs results in regression of right ventricular hypertrophy. On the other hand, prostacyclin therapy prolongs survival by inducing relaxation of vascular smooth muscles. This stimulates the production of cyclic AMP (cAMP), which inhibits the growth of smooth-muscle cells.

Overall, pulmonary arterial tension and acute coronary syndromes are few of the many diseases that lead to hypoxia of neuronal tissue, which in turns deteriorates the haemodynamic response and leads to neuronal death. Prolonged hypoxia induces neuronal death via apoptosis. With a dysfunctional haemodynamic response, active neuronal tissue due to membrane depolarization lacks the necessary energy to propagate signals, as a result of blood flow hindrance. This affects many functions in the body, and may lead to severe symptoms.

=== Reduced haemodynamic response diseases ===
==== Alzheimer's disease ====
In this disease, there is a build of the amyloid beta protein in the brain. This ultimately leads to a reduction in the haemodynamic response and less blood flow in the brain. This reduced cerebral blood flow not only kills neuronal cells because of shortages in oxygen and glucose but it also reduces the brain's ability to remove amyloid beta. In a healthy brain, these protein fragments are broken down and eliminated. In Alzheimer's disease, the fragments accumulate to form hard, insoluble plaques which reduce blood flow. Two proteins are involved in this accumulation of amyloid beta: serum response factor or SRF and myocardin. Together, these 2 proteins determine whether smooth muscle of blood vessels contract. SRF and myocardin are more active in the brains of people with Alzheimer's disease. When these proteins are active, they turn on SREBP2 which inhibits LRP-1. LRP-1 helps the brain remove amyloid beta. Therefore, when SRF and myocardin are active, there is a buildup in amyloid beta protein which ultimately leads to less blood flow in the brain because of contracted blood vessels.

==== Ischemia ====
A decrease in circulation in the brain vasculature due to stroke or injury can lead to a condition known as ischemia. In general, decrease in blood flow to the brain can be a result of thrombosis causing a partial or full blockage of blood vessels, hypotension in systemic circulation (and consequently the brain), or cardiac arrest. This decrease in blood flow in the cerebral vascular system can result in a buildup of metabolic wastes generated by neurons and glial cells and a decrease in oxygen and glucose delivery to them. As a result, cellular energy failure, depolarization of neuronal and glial membranes, edema, and excess neurotransmitter and calcium ion release can occur. This ultimately ends with cell death, as cells succumb to a lack of nutrients to power their metabolism and to a toxic brain environment, full of free radicals and excess ions that damage normal cell organelle function.

== Clinical use ==
Changes in brain activity are closely coupled with changes in blood flow in those areas, and knowing this has proved useful in mapping brain functions in humans. The measurement of haemodynamic response, in a clinical setting, can be used to create images of the brain in which especially active and inactive regions are shown as distinct from one another. This can be a useful tool in diagnosing neural disease or in pre-surgical planning. Functional MRI and PET scan are the most common techniques that use haemodynamic response to map brain function. Physicians use these imaging techniques to examine the anatomy of the brain, to determine which specific parts of the brain are handling certain high order functions, to assess the effects of degenerative diseases, and even to plan surgical treatments of the brain.

=== Functional magnetic resonance imaging ===
Functional magnetic resonance imaging (fMRI), is the medical imaging technique used to measure the haemodynamic response of the brain in relation to the neural activities. It is one of the most commonly used devices to measure brain functions and is relatively inexpensive to perform in a clinical setting. The onset of neural activity leads to a systematic series of physiological changes in the local network of blood vessels that include changes in the cerebral blood volume per unit of brain tissue (CBV), changes in the rate of cerebral blood flow, and changes in the concentration of oxyhemoglobin and deoxyhemoglobin. There are different fMRI techniques that can pick up a functional signal corresponding to changes in each of the previously mentioned components of the haemodynamic response. The most common functional imaging signal is the blood-oxygen-level dependent signal (BOLD), which primarily corresponds to the concentration of deoxyhemoglobin. The BOLD effect is based on the fact that when neuronal activity is increased in one part of the brain, there is also an increased amount of cerebral blood flow to that area which is the basis of haemodynamic response. This increase in blood flow produces an increase in the ratio of oxygenated hemoglobin relative to deoxygenated hemoglobin in that specific area. The difference in magnetic properties of oxygenated and deoxygenated hemoglobin is what allows fMRI imaging to produce an effective map of which neurons are active and which are not. In short, deoxygenated hemoglobin is paramagnetic while oxygenated hemoglobin is diamagnetic. Diamagnetic blood (oxyhemoglobin) interferes with the magnetic resonance (MR) signal less and this leads to an improved MR signal in that area of increased neuronal activity. However, Paramagnetic blood (deoxyhemoglobin) makes the local magnetic field inhomogenous. This has the effect of dephasing the signal emitted in this domain, causing destructive interference in the observed MR signal. Therefore, greater amounts of deoxyhemoglobin lead to less signal. Neuronal activity ultimately leads to an increase in local MR signaling corresponding to a decrease in the concentration of deoxyhemoglobin.

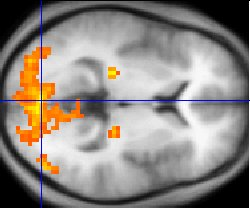
This sample fMRI shows how there are certain areas of activation during stimulation

If fMRI can be used to detect the regular flow of blood in a healthy brain, it can also be used to detect the problems with a brain that has undergone degenerative diseases. Functional MRI, using haemodynamic response, can help assess the effects of stroke and other degenerative diseases such as Alzheimer's disease on brain function. Another way fMRI could be used is in the planning of surgery of the brain. Surgeons can use fMRI to detect blood flow of the most active areas of the brain and the areas involved in critical functions like thought, speech, movement, etc. In this way, brain procedures are less dangerous because there is a brain mapping that shows which areas are vital to a person's life. Haemodynamic response is vital to fMRI and clinical use because through the study of blood flow we are able to examine the anatomy of the brain and effectively plan out procedures of the brain and link together the causes of degenerative brain disease.

Resting state fMRI enables the evaluation of the interaction of brain regions, when not performing a specific task. This is also used to show the default mode network.

=== PET scan ===
PET scan or Positron emission tomography scan is also used alongside fMRI for brain imaging. PET scan can detect active brain areas either haemodynamically or metabolically through glucose intake. They allow one to observe blood flow or metabolism in any part of the brain. The areas that are activated by increased blood flow and/or increased glucose intake are visualized in increased signal in the PET image.

Before a PET scan begins, the patient will be injected with a small dose of a radioactive medicine tagged to a tracer such as glucose or oxygen. Therefore, if the purpose of the PET scan is to determine brain activity, FDG or fluorodeoxyglucose will be the medicine used. FDG is a complex of radioactive fluorine that is tagged with glucose. If a certain part of the brain is more active, more glucose or energy will be needed there and more FDG will be absorbed. This increase in glucose intake will be detectable with increased signal in the PET image. PET scanners provide this feature because they measure the energy that is emitted when positrons from the radiotracer collide with electrons in the brain. As a radiotracer is broken down, more positrons are made and there will be an increased signal in the PET scan.
