= Cerebral blood volume =

Blood volume in an amount of brain tissue

Cerebral blood volume is the blood volume in a given amount of brain tissue.

== Pathophysiology ==
The typical human adult's skull contains approximately 1500 grams of the brain (including gray matter and white matter), 100-130 milliliters of blood, and 75 milliliters of cerebrospinal fluid. About 15% of the blood volume is present in the arteries, 40% in the veins, and 45% in the nerve tissue and capillaries.

There is a difference between the cerebral blood volume of gray and white matter. The cerebral blood volume value of gray matter is about 3.5 +/- 0.4 ml/100g, and the white matter is about 1.7 +/- 0.4 ml/100g. The gray matter is nearly twice that of white matter. In both white and gray matter, cerebral blood volume decreases by about 0.50% per year with increasing age. Intracranial hematoma and Intracerebral hemorrhage (ICH) will cause an increase in cerebral blood volume. Ischemic stroke will cause a substantial reduction in cerebral blood volume.

== Measurement methods ==
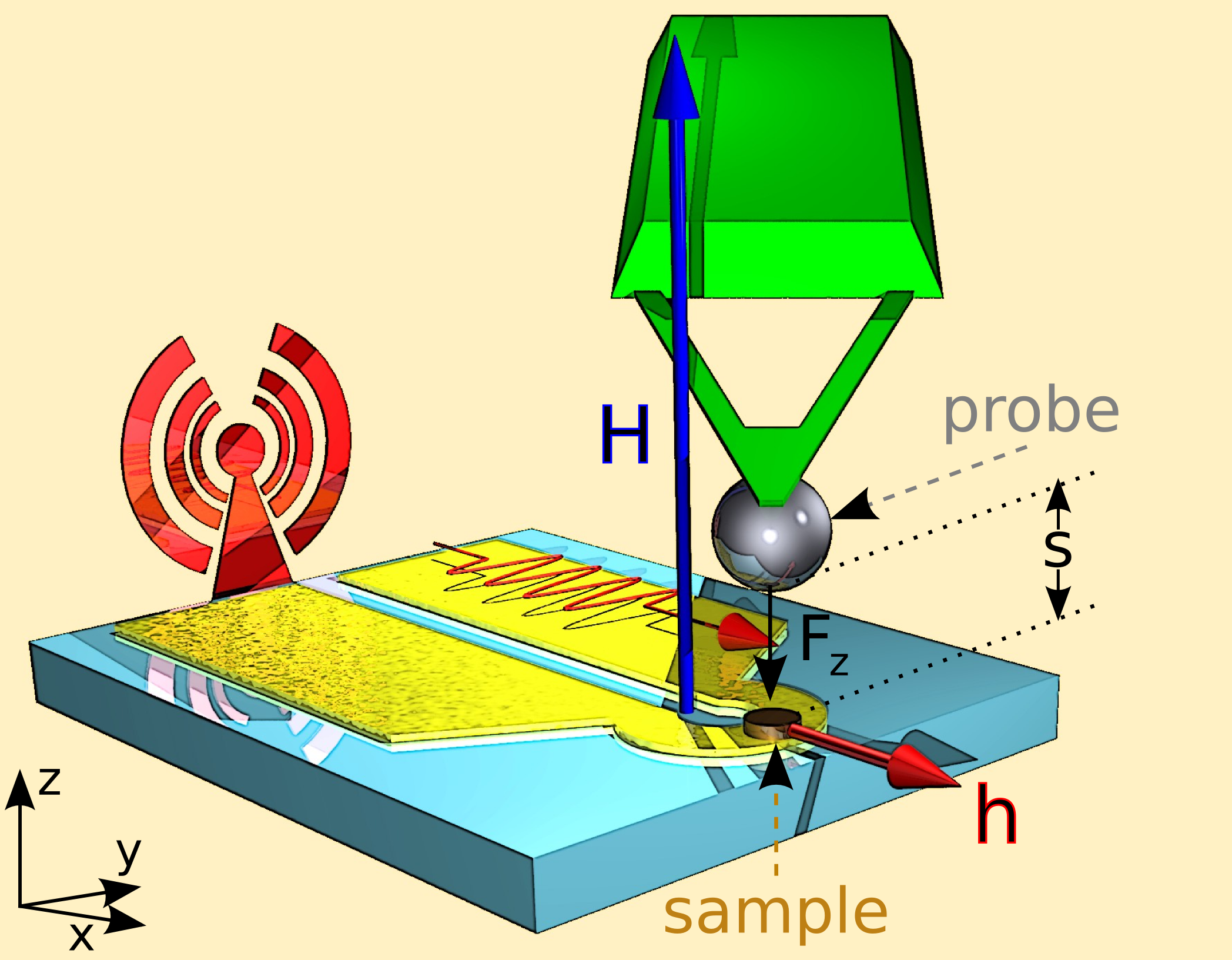
Schematic representation of a Magnetic Resonance

=== Magnetic resonance imaging ===
The cerebral blood volume maps can be calculated by dynamic magnetic resonance image set obtained by echo planar imaging after intravenous injection of thiol contrast agent. Planar imaging techniques or single high-speed shots provide the necessary resolution for contrast agents to display rapid brain blood movements. These magnetic resonance cerebral blood volume imaging methods can be applied to academic research of normal human brain activities and clinical studies of patients with brain tumors.

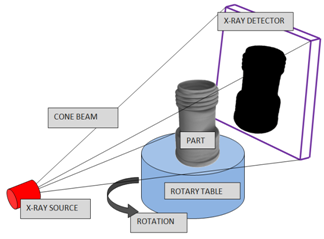
Ct scan cone beam

=== Emission computed tomography ===
In vivo studies using emission computed tomography gave coefficients of variation for regional cerebral blood volume and cross-sectional cerebral blood volume over 80 minutes. A clear tomographic depiction of cerebral blood volume distribution in human subjects can achieve by using emission computed tomography, which provides real-time measurements of the cerebral hemodynamic parameters. Carbon monoxide administered by a single inhalation is a reliable and accurate blood tracer for measuring cerebral blood volume with emission computed tomography.

=== Synchrotron radiation computed tomography ===
Synchrotron Radiation Computed Tomography uses a monochromatic and parallel X-ray beam to measure the value of cerebral blood volume. It allows the sample to be placed away from the detector, thereby avoiding scattering effects. This technique measures absolute contrast concentration with relatively high precision and spatial resolution. Cerebral blood volume measurements are based on methods used in dynamic computed tomography. After a large dose of iodinated contrast agent was injected into the brain tissue, the temporal change in iodine concentration was compared to changes in cerebral arterial input. It is a new method for studying hemodynamic changes in brain pathophysiology, including clinical studies of cerebrovascular diseases or brain tumors.

=== CT perfusion ===
Cerebral blood volume is one of the parameters that is assessed with CT perfusion, often as part of Ischemic stroke evaluation.

== Cerebral blood flow ==
Cerebral blood volume has a close and positive correlation with cerebral blood flow. Both cerebral blood volume and cerebral blood flow depend on several important parameters, including cerebrovascular resistance, intracranial pressure, and mean arterial pressure. The ratio between cerebral blood flow and cerebral blood volume can be an accurate predictor of decreased cerebral perfusion pressure, thereby predicting cerebral circulation.
