= AASP =

AASP may refer to:

- Apple Authorized Service Provider
- Association for Applied Sport Psychology
