= Rachel Chang =

Canadian atmospheric scientist

Rachel Chang is a Canadian atmospheric scientist, and an associate professor in the Department of Physics & Atmospheric Science at Dalhousie University. Chang is the Canada Research Chair (Tier II) in Atmospheric Science.

== Career ==
Chang is an associate professor at the Department of Physics & Atmospheric Science, at Dalhousie University. Her research explores how carbon cycles in and out of the ocean, including which factors impact the absorption of carbon dioxide into the ocean. In collaboration with the Environment and Climate Change Canada, Chang's research also includes studying particles in the atmosphere to understand their effects on air quality and visibility, such as measuring air particles before, during and after fog, and testing the chemical composition of fog water.

In 2017, Chang was appointed as a Canada Research Chair (Tier II) in Atmospheric Science. Her appointment was renewed in 2021. Chang's research has also been supported by the Canada First Research Excellence Fund.

To date, Chang has published over 90 academic publications, which have been cited over 3,500 times, resulting in an h-index of 33.

== Selected publications ==
- Organic condensation: a vital link connecting aerosol formation to cloud condensation nuclei (CCN) concentrations. I Riipinen, JR Pierce, T Yli-Juuti, Tuomo Nieminen, S Häkkinen, M Ehn, H Junninen, K Lehtipalo, T Petäjä, J Slowik, R Chang, NC Shantz, J Abbatt, WR Leaitch, V-M Kerminen, DR Worsnop, Spyros N Pandis, NM Donahue, M Kulmala. 2011. Atmospheric Chemistry and Physics.
- Cold season emissions dominate the Arctic tundra methane budget. Donatella Zona, Beniamino Gioli, Róisín Commane, Jakob Lindaas, Steven C Wofsy, Charles E Miller, Steven J Dinardo, Sigrid Dengel, Colm Sweeney, Anna Karion, Rachel Y-W Chang, John M Henderson, Patrick C Murphy, Jordan P Goodrich, Virginie Moreaux, Anna Liljedahl, Jennifer D Watts, John S Kimball, David A Lipson, Walter C Oechel. 2016. Proceedings of the National Academy of Sciences.
- The hygroscopicity parameter (κ) of ambient organic aerosol at a field site subject to biogenic and anthropogenic influences: relationship to degree of aerosol oxidation. RY-W Chang, JG Slowik, NC Shantz, A Vlasenko, J Liggio, SJ Sjostedt, WR Leaitch, JPD Abbatt. 2010. Atmospheric Chemistry and Physics.
- The arctic summer cloud ocean study (ASCOS): Overview and experimental design. Michael Tjernström, Caroline Leck, Cathryn E Birch, Jan W Bottenheim, Barbara J Brooks, Ian M Brooks, Leif Bäcklin, RY-W Chang, Gerardus de Leeuw, Luca Di Liberto, Sara De La Rosa, Eva Granath, Martin Graus, Armin Hansel, Jost Heintzenberg, Andreas Held, Andrew Hind, Paul Johnston, Johan Knulst, Maria Martin, Patricia A Matrai, Thorsten Mauritsen, Markus Müller, Sarah J Norris, Mónica V Orellana, Douglas A Orsini, Jussi Paatero, P Ola G Persson, Qiuju Gao, Carlton Rauschenberg, Zoran Ristovski, Joseph Sedlar, Matthew D Shupe, Berko Sierau, Anders Sirevaag, S Sjogren, Olaf Stetzer, Erik Swietlicki, Malgorzata Szczodrak, Petri Vaattovaara, Niklas Wahlberg, Martin Westberg, Cassie R Wheeler. 2014. Atmospheric Chemistry and Physics.
