= IPMI =

IPMI may refer to:

- Information Processing in Medical Imaging, a medical imaging conference running since 1969
- Intelligent Platform Management Interface, in computing
- Ivey Purchasing Managers Index, in economics
