= Dipanjan Roy =

Indian computational neuroscientist

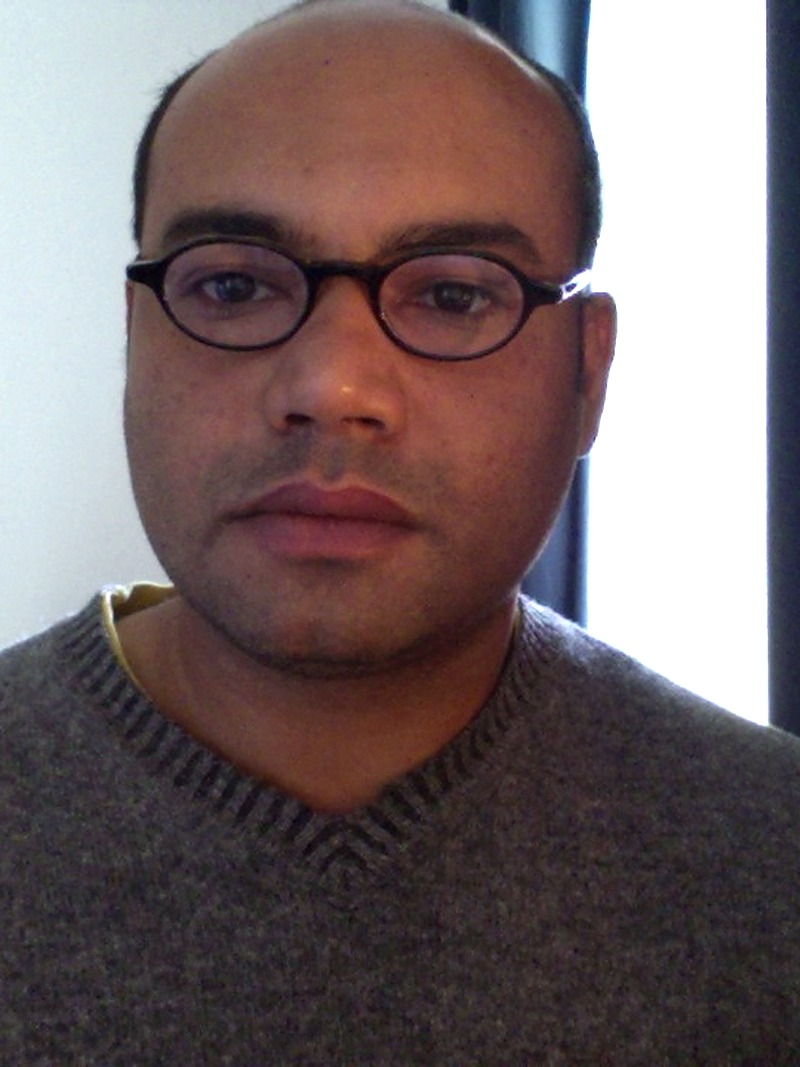
- Occupations: Computational neuroscientist, physicist, and academic

Academic background
- Education: B.Sc. M.S. Ph.D.
- Alma mater: University of Pune; University of Texas; Centre national de la recherche scientifique (CNRS) Institute of Systems Neuroscience
- Website: www.dipanjanr.com

Dipanjan Roy is a computational neuroscientist, physicist, and academic. He is a professor at the Indian Institute of Technology Jodhpur. He is a fellow of the National Academy of Sciences, India.

== Education ==
Roy earned his B.Sc. from the University of Pune in 1999, followed by an M.S. in Physics from the University of Texas in 2006. He completed his Ph.D. at the Centre national de la recherche scientifique (CNRS) Institute of Systems Neuroscience in Marseille in 2011, supervised by Viktor K. Jirsa.

== Career ==
Roy began his academic career as an assistant professor at the International Institute of Information Technology, Hyderabad from 2015 to 2016. He subsequently joined the Centre of Behavioural and Cognitive Sciences (CBCS), University of Allahabad as an assistant professor from 2016 to 2017. In 2017, he was appointed associate professor at the National Brain Research Centre, where he worked until 2021. He then joined the Indian Institute of Technology Jodhpur as an associate professor, working from 2021 to 2025, and has been a professor there since 2026.

== Awards and honors ==
- 2016 – 2021 – Ramalingaswami Fellow, Department of Biotechnology, Government of India
- 2023 – Fellow, National Academy of Sciences, India
