= Lars-Eric Uneståhl =

Lars-Eric Uneståhl, born in 1938, is a Psychologist and PhD in psychology. He is one of the psychologists in Sweden that introduced the Swedish Model of Mental Training for athletes and others.

Uneståhl began in the 1970s to help prominent athletes with mental training. He later extended the range include business management. Uneståhl has published over a hundred books, tapes and CDs focusing on mental training which many in the field of sport psychology. He runs the Scandinavian International University AB in Örebro.

== Selected bibliography ==
- Treatment effects of hypnosis, Uppsala University. Department of Psychology, (1969)
- Psychological factors in elite shooting together with Margareta Gustavsson (1975) ISSN 0280-1396; 2
- Mental training (1978) ISSN 0280-1396; 12
- Hypnosis in Theory and Practice (1982), 4:e uppl. 1999, ISBN 91-85810-03-7
- Integrated mental training (1996) ISBN 91-87660-11-3
- The new way of life: mental training advice for stress and a better life (2001) ISBN 91-85810-46-0
