= Information Processing in Medical Imaging =

IPMI conference series

Information Processing in Medical Imaging (IPMI) is a conference held every two years focused on the fields of applied mathematics, computer science, image processing and image analysis (particularly of medical images); applied results in neuroscience, cardiology, and microscopy are also frequently considered. IPMI is the longest standing conference focused on medical images having first met, organized by Dr. Francois Erbsmann, in Brussels in 1969. IPMI 2027 is scheduled to be held in Lake Stukely, Canada in June 2027.

== History ==
The Information Processing in Medical Imaging conference – IPMI - was first organized by Francois Erbsmann and collaborators in Brussels in 1969. That first conference was held under the title, “Information Processing in Scintigraphy” as at the time the meeting was focused on restoration of those images derived by nuclear medicine. Since that first instance, the conference has successfully met every two years. The third instance of the meeting, organized by Stephen Pizer and Charles Metz, was its first appearance in the United States and since that occasion IPMI has alternated its venue between the U.S. and Europe. It was the 1977 meeting organized by Randy Brill in Nashville that first used the name IPMI to reflect the broadening community of physicists, mathematicians, computer scientists, and biologists interested in medical image computing in its many manifestations and applications who now contributed to the meeting. Commemorating his contribution as the conference founder, beginning with IPMI 1987 the Francois Erbsmann prize is awarded by the IPMI board each conference to one young investigator for outstanding contribution to the field. This investigator must have given their first oral presentation at the current IPMI.

Standing with tradition, IPMI includes a single track of presentations on novel methodology wherein speakers are allotted sufficient time to describe their contributions in thorough detail. Discussions following each presentation have no time-limit permitting stimulating debate and resolution of any questions or comments regarding the work, alternatives to it, additional possible applications, etc. Further, the paper associated with each presentation is assigned a study-group of attendees in advance rendering a portion of the community prepared to provide real time peer discussion in high technical detail. Study groups often pair younger researchers with field experts encouraging an exchange of experience and new ideas. Often, discussions and debates are continued through meals and social activities uniting the community through vigorous evaluation of avant-garde developments in medical imaging. To permit such depth the conference is limited to a maximum of 120 participants.

Reflecting its focus on depth and community, IPMI is often held in a relatively small and sometimes remote location. Attendees are accommodated together in collective housing in campus or university dorms, meals are typically enjoyed together by the entire community, and by a string of luck IPMI conferences have thus far been held in close proximity to a bar open sufficiently late to host continued scholarly debate. Further, IPMI fosters collaboration through its several social functions including the traditional soccer match and activities that take advantage of the typically remote setting.

== Past Francois Erbsmann Prize Winners ==
1987 (Utrecht, The Netherlands): John M. Gauch, University of North Carolina, Chapel Hill, NC, USA.

J.M. Gauch, W.R. Oliver, S.M. Pizer: Multiresolution shape descriptions and their applications in medical imaging.

1989 (Berkeley, CA, USA): Arthur F. Gmitro, University of Arizona, Tucson, AZ, USA.

A.F. Gmitro, V. Tresp, V. Chen, Y. Snell, G.R. Gindi: Video-rate reconstruction of CT and MR images.

1991 (Wye, Kent, UK): H. Isil Bozma, Yale University, New Haven, CT, USA.

H.I. Bozma, J.S. Duncan: Model-based recognition of multiple deformable objects using a game-theoretic framework.

1993 (Flagstaff, AZ, USA): Jeffrey A. Fessler, University of Michigan, Ann Arbor, MI, USA.

J.A. Fessler: Tomographic reconstruction using information-weighted spline smoothing.

1995 (Brest, France): Maurits K. Konings, University Hospital, Utrecht, The Netherlands.

M.K. Konings, W.P.T.M. Mali, M.A. Viergever: Design of a robust strategy to measure intravascular electrical impedance.

1997 (Poultney, VT, USA): David Atkinson, Guy's Hospital, London, UK.

D. Atkinson, D.L.G. Hill, P.N.R. Stoyle, P.E. Summers, S.F. Keevil: An autofocus algorithm for the automatic correction of motion artifacts in MR images.

1999 (Visegrad, Hungary): Liana M. Lorigo, Massachusetts Institute of Technology, Cambridge, MA, USA.

L.M. Lorigo, O. Faugeras, W.E.L. Grimson, R. Keriven, R. Kikinis, C.-F. Westin: Co-dimension 2 geodesic active contours for MRA segmentation.

2001 (Davis, CA, USA): Viktor K. Jirsa, Florida Atlantic University, FL, USA.

V.K. Jirsa, K.J. Jantzen, A. Fuchs, J.A. Scott Kelso: Neural field dynamics on the folded three-dimensional cortical sheet and its forward EEG and MEG.

2003 (Ambleside, UK): Guillaume Marrelec, INSERM, France.

G. Marrelec, P. Ciuciu, M. Pélégrini-Issac, H. Benali: Estimation of the hemodynamic response function in event-related functional MRI: directed acyclic graphs for a general Bayesian inference framework.

2005 (Glenwood Springs, Colorado, USA): Duygu Tosun, Johns Hopkins University, Baltimore, USA.

D. Tosun, J.L. Prince: Cortical surface alignment using geometry driven multispectral optical flow.

2007 (Kerkrade, The Netherlands): Ben Glocker, Technical University of Munich, Garching, Germany.

B. Glocker, N. Komodakis, N. Paragios, G. Tziritas, and N. Navab: Inter- and intra-modal deformable registration: continuous deformations meet efficient optimal linear programming.

2009 (Williamsburg, VA, USA): Maxime Descoteaux, NeuroSpin, Saclay, France

M. Descoteaux, R. Deriche, D. Le Bihan, J.F. Mangin, C. Poupon: Diffusion Propagator Imaging: Using Laplace's Equation and Multiple Shell Acquisitions to Reconstruct the Diffusion Propagator

2011 (Kloster Irsee, Germany): Hubert Fonteijn, University College London, London, UK.

H. M. Fonteijn, M. J. Clarkson, M. Modat, J. Barnes, M. Lehmann, S. Ourselin, N. C. Fox, D. C. Alexander: An Event-Based Disease Progression Model and Its Application to Familial Alzheimer's Disease

2013 (Asilomar, California, USA): Hervé Lombaert, McGill University, Montreal

H. Lombaert, J. Sporring, K. Siddiqi: Towards Diffeomorphic Spectral Matching of Cortical Surfaces

2015 (Isle of Skye, Scotland, UK): Joseph Dagher, University of Arizona

J. Dagher: A Joint Acquisition-Estimation Framework for MR Phase Imaging

2017 (Boone, North Carolina, USA): Thomas Schlegl, Medical University of Vienna

Thomas Schlegl, Philipp Seeböck, Sebastian Waldstein, Georg Langs: Unsupervised Anomaly Detection with Generative Adversarial Networks to Guide Marker Discovery

2019 (Hong Kong): Sara Garbarino, Université Côte d’Azur

Sara Garbarino and Marco Lorenzi: Modeling and Inference of Spatio-Temporal Protein Dynamics Across Brain Networks

2021 (Virtual, Bornholm, Denmark): Kristen Campbell, University of Utah

Kristen Campbell, Haocheng Dai, Zhe Su, Martin Bauer, Tom Fletcher, Sarang Joshi: Structural Connectome Atlas Construction in the Space of Riemannian Metrics

2023 (Bariloche, Argentina): John Orlando Kalkhof, TU Darmstadt

John Orlando Kalkhof, Camila Gonzalez, Anirban Mukhopadhyay: Med-NCA: Robust and Lightweight Segmentation with Neural Cellular Automata
