= Proceedings of the National Academy of Sciences, India Section A =

- Discipline: Physical sciences
- Language: English
- Edited by: Jai Pal Mittal

Publication details
- History: 1930–present
- Publisher: Springer
- Frequency: Quarterly
- Impact factor: 0.754 (2017)

Standard abbreviations
- ISO 4: Proc. Natl. Acad. Sci. India A
- MathSciNet: Proc. Nat. Acad. Sci. India Sect. A

Indexing
- ISSN: 0369-8203 (print); 2250-1762 (web)

Links
- Journal homepage

Proceedings of the National Academy of Sciences, India Section A: Physical Sciences is a peer-reviewed scientific journal of physical science. It is published by Springer on behalf of National Academy of Sciences, India four times a year, and is edited by Jai Pal Mittal.

== Abstracting and indexing ==
The journal is abstracted and indexed in the following bibliographic databases:

- BIOSIS
- Biological Abstracts
- CNKI
- Chemical Abstracts Service
- EBSCO Discovery Service
- INSPEC
- INSPIRE-HEP
- Indian Science Abstracts
- Journal Citation Reports/Science Edition
- Mathematical Reviews
- ProQuest Advanced Technologies & Aerospace Database
- ProQuest SciTech Premium Collection
- ProQuest Technology Collection
- SCOPUS
- Science Citation Index Expanded
- Summon by ProQuest
- Zentralblatt Math
- Zoological Record

According to the Journal Citation Reports, the journal has a 2017 impact factor of 0.754.
