= Jai Pal Mittal =

Indian scientist

- Born: 21 September 1940 (age 85); Meerut, Uttar Pradesh, India
- Occupation: Scientist
- Known for: Photochemistry, radiation chemistry
- Awards: Padma Shri; Humboldt Research Award; Senior JSPS Award; INSA T. R. Seshadri Commemoration Medal; INSA Golden Jubilee Commemoration Medal; INSA; NASI N. R. Dhar Memorial Medal; Goyal Gold Medal; ISCA Platinum Jubilee Award

Jai Pal Mittal (born 21 September 1940) is an Indian scientist, DAE Raja Ramanna Fellow of Bhabha Atomic Research Centre and Distinguished Professor of Indian Institute of Technology, Mumbai, the National Academy of Sciences, India and the University of Pune. He is known for his researches in the fields of photochemistry and radiation chemistry. He was honoured by the Government of India in 2003 with Padma Shri, the fourth highest Indian civilian award.

== Biography ==
Jai Pal Mittal was born on 21 September 1940 in Meerut in the Indian state of Uttar Pradesh. He completed his graduate (BSc) and master's studies (MSc) in chemistry from the Agra University and migrated to Mumbai in 1959, looking for career opportunities. He joined the Training School of Atomic Energy Establishment, erstwhile Bhabha Atomic Research Centre and did a one-year course after which he moved to USA to join the Department of Radiation Chemistry of the University of Notre Dame, Indiana. He completed his doctoral studies (PhD) in 1967, under the guidance of A. A. Lamola and W. H. Hamill. Receiving an invitation from Willard Libby, the 1960 Nobel laureate in Chemistry, to assist him, Mittal did his post doctoral research, for over a year, at the Radiation and Nuclear Chemistry laboratory of the University of California.

In 1969, Mittal returned to India to start his career as a Pool Officer at the Bhabha Atomic Research Centre (BARC) and started working in the field of photochemistry. Two years later, in 1971, he got an opportunity to work with Professor E. Hayon at the United States Army Natick Soldier Research, Development and Engineering Center and worked there for one year. On his return to India in 1972, he formed a research group at BARC for research in photochemistry and radiation chemistry. During this period, he organized the first national symposium in Thiruvananthapuram, National Symposium on Fast Reaction Chemistry and Techniques.

Mittal continued at BARC to become the Director of Chemistry and Isotope Group and the DAE Raja Ramanna Fellow of the institution. He also holds the position of M. N. Saha Distinguished Professor of the National Academy of Sciences, India and the post of a Distinguished Professor at the University of Pune and the Indian Institute of Technology, Mumbai. During his tenure at BARC, he is known to have contributed for the establishment of a nanosecond LINAC based pulse radiolysis system at BARC and promoted the nano, pico and femtosecond pump and probe techniques to study the chemical dynamics. He is reported to have initiated a new school of research in Radiation Chemistry and Photochemistry in India and his group was successful in isotopic enrichment of hydrogen, carbon and uranium isotopes. His research findings have been recorded by way of over 300 scientific papers, published in peer reviewed journals and ResearchGate, an online scientific data repository, have listed 250 of them. He has also mentored many students in their doctoral studies.

Mittal has been associated with the Board of Research in Nuclear Sciences as a chairman of many of its basic sciences committees. He is a former president of the Indian Society of Radiation and Photochem Sciences (1997-2001), the National Academy of Sciences, India (2003–04) and the Asian Photochemistry Association (2003- 2008). He has also served the Indian National Science Academy as a council member (1998-2000) and as an additional member (2005–06). He serves as the president of the Asian and Oceanian Photochemistry Association and is a member of the education council of the University of Allahabad. He is a life member of the Indian Chemical Society where has also been a past president.

Mittal lives in Navi Mumbai in Maharashtra and continues attending seminars and conferences to deliver keynote addresses.

== Awards and recognitions ==
Jai Pal Mittal is an elected fellow the Indian National Science Academy, National Academy of Sciences, India, The World Academy of Sciences, the Indian Academy of Sciences and the Maharashtra Academy of Sciences. He is a recipient of two awards, Professor T. R. Seshadri 70th Birthday Commemoration Medal in 1994 and the Golden Jubilee Commemoration Medal in 2001, from the Indian National Science Academy. A winner of 1964 Fulbright scholarship and 2002 Humboldt Research Award, Mittal has received the Senior JSPS Award, National Academy of Sciences, India N. R. Dhar Memorial Medal, Goyal Gold Medal and the Indian Science Congress Association Platinum Jubilee Award. The Government of India awarded him the civilian award of Padma Shri in 2003.

== See also ==
- Bhabha Atomic Research Centre
