= Proceedings of the National Academy of Sciences, India Section B =

- Discipline: Biological sciences
- Language: English
- Edited by: Yogendra Singh

Publication details
- History: 1930–present
- Publisher: Springer
- Frequency: Quarterly
- Impact factor: 0.96 (2020)

Standard abbreviations
- ISO 4: Proc. Natl. Acad. Sci. India B

Indexing
- ISSN: 0369-8211 (print); 2250-1746 (web)

Links
- Journal homepage

Proceedings of the National Academy of Sciences, India Section B: Biological Sciences is a peer-reviewed scientific journal of biological science. It is published by Springer on behalf of National Academy of Sciences, India four times a year, and its editor-in-Chief is Yogendra Singh.

== Abstracting and indexing ==
The journal is abstracted and indexed in the following bibliographic databases:

- AGRICOLA
- BIOSIS
- Biological Abstracts
- CAB Abstracts
- CNKI
- Chemical Abstracts Service
- EBSCO Discovery Service
- Global Health
- Indian Science Abstracts
- ProQuest Biological Science Database
- ProQuest Natural Science Collection
- ProQuest SciTech Premium Collection
- SCOPUS
- Summon by ProQuest
- Zoological Record

According to the Journal Citation Reports, the journal has a 2020 impact factor of 0.96.
