= Canadian Society for Psychomotor Learning and Sport Psychology =

Canadian organization for psychomotor learning and sport psychology

- Formation: 1977
- President: Erin Cressman
- Website: www.scapps.org

The Canadian Society for Psychomotor Learning and Sport Psychology (French: Société Canadienne d´Apprentissage Psychomotor et de Psychology du Sport) (SCAPPS) is a multidisciplinary association that promotes psychomotor learning and sport psychology in Canada.

== History ==
SCAPPS was founded in 1969 by Robert Wilberg at the University of Alberta. Until 1977 the society was part of the Canadian Association for Health, Physical Education and Recreation. SCAPPS holds an annual convention every year and has been influential in the fields of motor behavior and sport psychology, particularly in North America.

== Journals ==
- Journal of Exercise, Movement, and Sport (JEMS)

== See also ==
- Sport psychology
