= Viktor K. Jirsa =

German physicist and neuroscientist

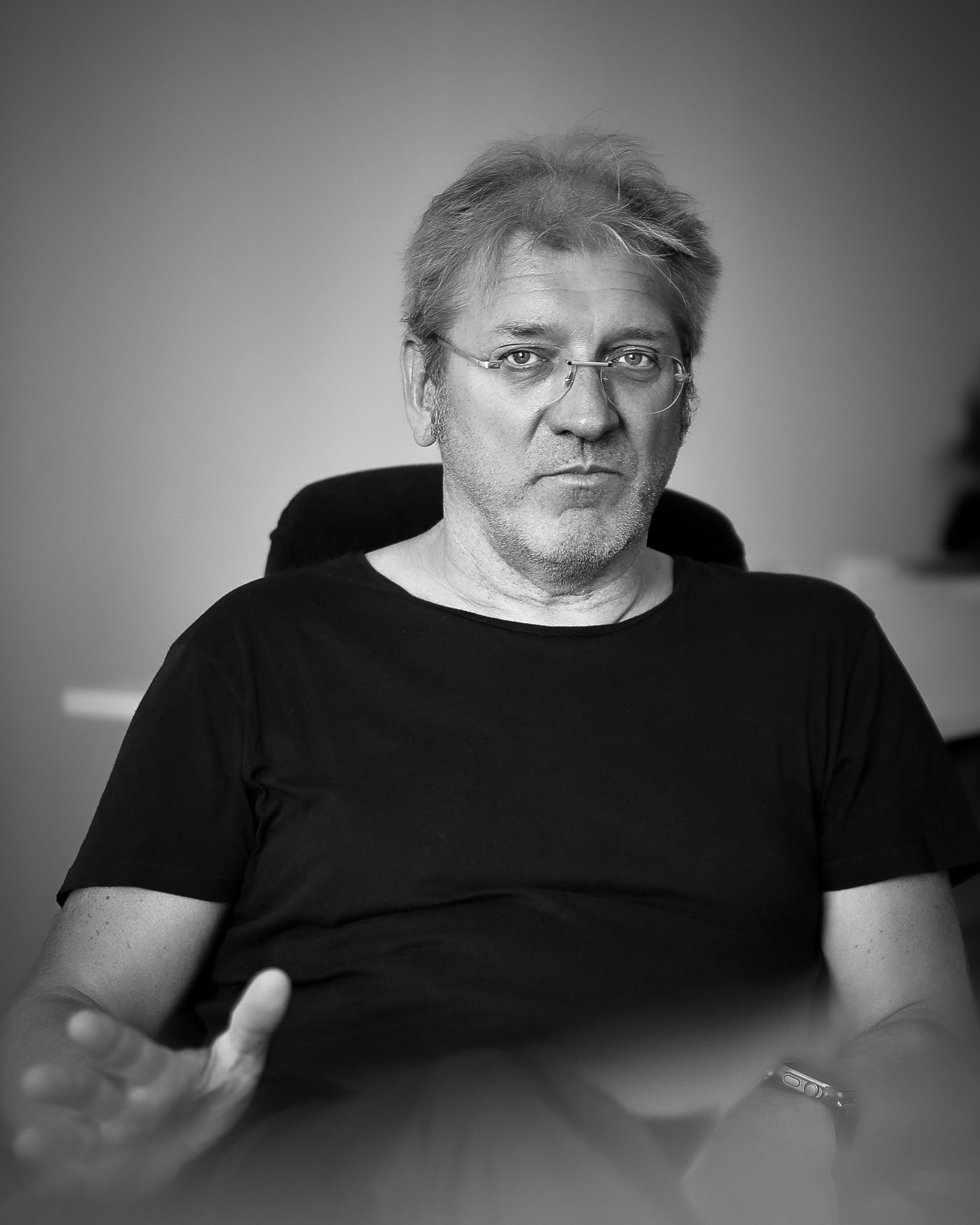
- Viktor Jirsa in 2024
- Born: 27 June 1968 (age 58); Prague, Czechia
- Known for: The Virtual Brain network theory
- Awards: Francois Erbsmann Prize (2001) Early Career Distinguished Scholar (2004)

Academic work
- Discipline: Computational Neuroscience
- Main interests: Principles of self-organization and spatiotemporal pattern formation in large scale brain networks. Brain function and dysfunction, in particular epilepsy.
- Website: ins-amu.fr/jirsaviktor

Viktor K. Jirsa (born 27 June 1968) is a Czech-German physicist and computational neuroscientist whose work links large-scale brain modelling with brain imaging. He is Director of Research (DRCE) at the Centre national de la recherche scientifique (CNRS) and heads the Institut de Neuroscience des Systèmes (INS UMR1106) at Inserm Aix-Marseille University. Since 2022 he serves as Chief Science Officer of the European digital neuroscience infrastructure EBRAINS.

Since the late 1990s, Jirsa's research focuses on how the human brain's function relates to network dynamics. He pioneered the integration of biologically realistic connectivity into human and rodent brain network models. Clinical applications of his large-scale brain modelling approach are widespread in diagnosis, understanding and therapy of epilepsy and psychiatry. Throughout his academic career Jirsa has played leading roles in personalized medicine and translational computational neuroscience within the Human Brain Project (HBP) and other large European initiatives. He is lead scientist of the open source neuroinformatics platform The Virtual Brain.

== Early life and education ==
Jirsa was born in Prague, Czechia and grew up in Stuttgart, Germany. He studied elementary particle physics at the University of Manchester, United Kingdom where he obtained his Master of Science (M.Sc.) in 1991. He then combined philosophy with theoretical physics at the University of Stuttgart, Germany, earning a Diplom (Master's degree) in 1993, followed by a doctorate (Dr. rer. nat.) in applied mathematics/theoretical physics in 1996, under Hermann Haken. His postdoctoral work with J. A. Scott Kelso at the Florida Atlantic University (FAU) focused on brain and behavioral dynamics (1997-1998).

== Academic career ==
In 1999 Jirsa started as assistant professor at the Florida Atlantic University and founded the Theoretical Neuroscience Group (TNG). From 2004 to 2005 he held the role of tenured Associate Professor of Physics of Complex Systems & Brain Sciences. In 2006 Jirsa was recruited as Director of Research for the French Centre National de la Recherche Scientifique (CNRS) in Marseille, France. In 2012 he co-founded the Institut de Neuroscience des Systèmes (INS, Aix-Marseille University) with neurologist Patrick Chauvel, becoming its director in 2014.

Jirsa was a work package leader and member of the Science and Infrastructure Board of the Human Brain Project before joining the management board of the non-profit successor organization EBRAINS as Chief Science Officer in 2022. In this role he guides the European efforts in digital neuroscience to translate multiscale brain models into clinical and industrial applications.

== Research contributions ==
=== The Virtual Brain ===
"The Virtual Brain" (TVB) is an open source software platform which turns brain connectomes derived from MRI into personalized whole-brain simulations, allowing researchers and clinicians to test interventions on virtualized patient brains. Jirsa led the work package building The Virtual Brain within the "Brain Network Recovery Group", a consortium of 16 international scientists from computational, cognitive and clinical neuroscience, coordinated by Randy McIntosh from 2005 to 2015.

In 2018, TVB was integrated as neuroinformatics platform into the Human Brain Project (HBP), a €607 million EU scientific research project. Since 2023 TVB is the principal full-brain simulator of the successor organization of HBP, the European Brain Research Infrastructures (EBRAINS). It underpins international training programs and clinical trials, including the 400-patient clinical trial EPINOV ("Improving epilepsy surgery management and prognosis using virtual brain technology") for drug-resistant epilepsy where Jirsa serves as scientific director.

=== Connectome-based brain models ===
In the early 2000s, Jirsa was among the first to show that realistic white matter topology and conduction delays in the brain are essential for reproducing fMRI resting state patterns, opening a field which is now central to network neuroscience.

=== Structured flows on manifolds (SFM) ===
Structured flows on manifolds are mathematical objects that underlie the evolution of brain activity. Jirsa and colleagues showed that the brain's high-dimensional activity collapses onto low-dimensional spaces, where it follows emergent rule-based behavior ("flows"). SFM explain how connectome-driven breaking of symmetry yields a set of trajectories that reproduce resting state cascades and fast switching seen in fMRI and MEG scans. This SFM framework delivers guidelines for interventions that aim to bring the brain back onto healthy trajectories in ageing, epilepsy and psychiatric disorders.

=== Epileptor and seizure taxonomy ===
Epilepsy is characterized by the onset and offset of high-frequency discharges visible in EEG scans of patients undergoing a seizure. Nonlinear dynamical system theory suggests that there is only a finite number of ways to start and stop an oscillation. Applying bifurcation theory, Jirsa and colleagues derived a canonical model called "Epileptor" that reproduces 16 seizure "dynamotypes". The Epileptor explains stereotyped onsets and offsets across different species and predicts therapeutic windows, some of them validated clinically.

The respective publication in Brain (Oxford University Press) was marked as "Editor's choice". In a commentary to Jirsa et al.'s publication, neuroscientist and theoretician Karl Friston underlined the significant breakthrough of Jirsa's findings for the entire field of epilepsy.

=== Digital twin medicine ===
Since 2015 Jirsa is evolving his fundamental models into a personalized digital twin of the human brain with a focus on clinical application in precision neurology. He holds leading roles in European research projects (Virtual Brain Twin, EBRAINS 2.0) and French projects (Nautilus) to extend the applicability of his models to psychiatric drug response and non-invasive neurostimulation.

== Selected publications ==
- 2014: Jirsa V; Stacey W; Quilichini P; Ivanov A; Bernard C (August 2014). "On the Nature of Seizure Dynamics". Brain. 137 (8): 2210–2230. doi:10.1093/brain/awu133. ISSN 0006-8950. PMC 4107736. PMID 24919973. S2CID 26411733.
- 2017: Pillai A; Jirsa V (June 2017). "Symmetry Breaking in Space-Time Hierarchies Shapes Brain Dynamics and Behavior". Neuron. 94 (5): 1010–1026. doi:10.1016/j.neuron.2017.05.013. ISSN 0896-6273. PMID 28595045. S2CID 8099195.
- 2020: Saggio M; Crisp D; Scott J; Karoly P; Kuhlmann L; Nakatani M; Murai T; Dümpelmann M; Schulze-Bonhage A; Ikeda A; Cook M; Gliske S; Lin J; Bernard C; Jirsa V; Stacey W (July 2020). "A taxonomy of seizure dynamotypes". eLife. 9 e55632. doi:10.7554/eLife.55632. ISSN 2050-084X. PMC 7375810. PMID 32691734. S2CID 218764789.
- 2022: Jirsa V; Sheheitli H (February 2022). "Entropy, free energy, symmetry and dynamics in the brain". Journal of Physics: Complexity. 3 (1): 015007. doi:10.1088/2632-072X/ac4bec. ISSN 2632-072X.
- 2022: D'Angelo E; Jirsa V (October 2022). "The quest for multiscale brain modeling". Trends in Neurosciences. 45 (10): 777–790. doi:10.1016/j.tins.2022.06.007. ISSN 0166-2236. PMID 35906100. S2CID 251073412.
- 2023: Wang H; Woodman M; Triebkorn P; Lemarechal J; Jha J; Dollomaja B; Vattikonda A; Sip V; Villalon S; Hashemi M; Guye M; Makhalova J; Bartolomei F; Jirsa V (January 2023). "Delineating epileptogenic networks using brain imaging data and personalized modeling in drug resistant epilepsy". Science Translational Medicine. 15 (680) eabp8982. doi:10.1126/scitranslmed.abp8982. ISSN 1946-6234. PMID 36696482. S2CID 256231609.
- 2023: Jirsa V; Wang H; Triebkorn P; Hashemi M; Jha J; Gonzalez-Martinez J; Guye M; Makhalova J; Bartolomei F (May 2023). "Personalised virtual brain models in epilepsy". The Lancet Neurology. 22 (5): 443–454. doi:10.1016/S1474-4422(23)00008-X. ISSN 1474-4465. PMID 36972720. S2CID 257718959.
- 2025: Hashemi M; Depannemaecker D; Saggio M; Triebkorn P; Rabuffo G; Fousek J; Ziaeemehr A; Sip V; Athanasiadis A; Breyton M; Woodman M; Wang H; Petkoski S; Sorrentino P; Jirsa V (April 2025). "Principles and Operation of Virtual Brain Twins". IEEE Reviews in Biomedical Engineering. PP: 1–29. doi:10.1109/RBME.2025.3562951. ISSN 1937-3333. PMID 40257892. S2CID 273649232.

== Awards and recognition ==
Jirsa is invited regularly to major international conferences and has given more than 200 invited lectures, including various keynote addresses and plenary lectures, e.g. for OHBM, INCF or NIH.

He has been awarded several international and national awards for his research, including:

- 2025 Change the World – Rise Partners Innovation Award
- 2021 First Human Brain Project Innovation Prize
- 2018 Elected member of the Academia Scientiarium et Artium Europaea
- 2018 Grand Prix de Recherche de Provence
- 2004 NASPSPA EarlyCareer Distinguished Scholar Award
- 2001 Francois Erbsmann Prize at the conference "Information Processing in Medical Imaging" (IPMI)
