= Sport psychology =

Branch of psychology

Sport psychology is defined as the study of the psychological basis, processes, and effects of sport. One definition of sport sees it as "any physical activity for the purposes of competition, recreation, education or health". Sport psychology is an interdisciplinary science that draws on knowledge from related fields such as biomechanics, physiology, kinesiology, and psychology. It studies how psychological factors influence athletic performance, and how participation in sport and exercise impacts psychological, social, and physical well-being. Sport psychologists also teach cognitive and behavioral techniques to athletes to enhance both their performance and overall experience in sports.

A sport psychologist does not focus solely on athletes. This type of professional also helps non-athletes and everyday exercisers learn how to enjoy sports and to stick to an exercise program. A psychologist is someone that helps with the mental and emotional aspects of someone's state, so a sport psychologist would help people in regard to sports, but also in regard to physical activity. In addition to instruction and training in psychological skills for performance improvement, applied sport psychology may include work with athletes, coaches, and parents regarding injury, rehabilitation, communication, team-building, and post-athletic career transitions.

Sport psychologists may also work on helping athletes and non-athletes cope with how training and competition demands, injury and rehabilitation, and major transitions affect multiple life domains (e.g., relationships, mental health, work, and school).

In addition to psychological influences, this article briefly addresses the genetic component of sport, acknowledging that certain genes may contribute to performance, motivation, endurance, and injury risk.

== History of sport psychology ==
=== Early history ===
In its formation, sport psychology was primarily the domain of physical educators, not researchers, which can explain the lack of a consistent history. Nonetheless, many instructors sought to explain the various phenomena associated with physical activity and developed sport psychology laboratories.

The history of sport psychology dates back almost 200 years. In 1830, Carl Friedrich Koch published Calisthenics from the Viewpoint of Dietetics and Psychology. Later, in 1879, Wilhelm Wundt established the first psychology laboratory, where some of the earliest sport psychology experiments were conducted. In 1884, Konrad Rieger researched muscular endurance and hypnosis, while in 1891, Angelo Mosso studied mental fatigue and physical performance. The term "sport psychology" was first used in 1900 by Pierre de Coubertin, who, along with Wundt, made significant contributions in the early 20th century.

In Europe, the field developed largely in Germany. In the early 1920s, Dr. Carl Diem founded the first sport psychology laboratory in Berlin. Around the same time, Robert Werner Schulte established the Deutsche Hochschule für Leibesübungen (College of Physical Education) in 1920, where physical abilities and sport aptitude were studied. In 1921, Schulte also published Body and Mind in Sport. In Russia, sport psychology experiments began as early as 1925 at institutes of physical culture in Moscow and Leningrad, and formal sport psychology departments were formed around 1930. However, it was a bit later during the Cold War period (1946–1989) that numerous sport science programs were formed, due to the military competitiveness between the Soviet Union and the United States, and as a result of attempts to increase the Olympic medal numbers. The Americans felt that their sport performances were inadequate and very disappointing compared to the ones of the Soviets, so this led them to invest more in the methods that could ameliorate their athletes performance, and made them have a greater interest on the subject. The advancement of sport psychology was more deliberate in the Soviet Union and the Eastern countries, due to the creation of sports institutes where sport psychologists played an important role.

In North America, early years of sport psychology included isolated studies of motor behavior, social facilitation, and habit formation. During the 1890s, E. W. Scripture conducted a range of behavioral experiments, including measuring the reaction time of runners, thought time in school children, and the accuracy of an orchestra conductor's baton. Despite Scripture's previous experiments, the first recognized sport psychology study was carried out by an American psychologist Norman Triplett, in 1898. The work of Norman Triplett demonstrated that bicyclists were more likely to cycle faster with a pacemaker or a competitor, which has been foundational in the literature of social psychology and social facilitation. He wrote about his findings in what was regarded as the first scientific paper on sport psychology, titled "The Dynamogenic Factors in Pacemaking and Competition", which was published in 1898, in the American Journal of Psychology. Lashley and Watson, pertaining to the learning curve present in archery, provided a template for future habit forming research, as their work proved that humans have a higher level of motivation to achieve a task such as archery in comparison to a mundane task. Researchers Albert Johanson and Joseph Holmes tested baseball player Babe Ruth in 1921, as reported by sportswriter Hugh S. Fullerton. Ruth's swing speed, his breathing right before hitting a baseball, his coordination and rapidity of wrist movement, and his reaction time were all measured, with the researchers concluding that Ruth's talent could be attributed in part to motor skills and reflexes that were well above those of the average person.

The field of sport psychology in general began in the 1960s with the formation of the International Society of Sport Psychology in 1965, The North American Society for the Psychology of Sport and Physical Activity in 1967, and The Canadian Society for Psychomotor Learning and Sport Psychology in 1969. Sport psychology started in 1890 when Norman Triplett performed the first experiment in sport psychology and the social facilitation phenomenon. Then 1925 Coleman Griffith created the Athletic Research Laboratory at the University of Illinois. Later in 1930 the Soviet Union employed sport psychology during the Cold War. In 1960 sport psychology becomes part of the US and expanded to the whole world. In 1986 the American Psychological Association recognized Sport psychology as a branch of Psychology. In 1992, the Psychology Board of Australia recognized "Sport Psychologist" as a protected title, and in 1993 British Psychology Society formed a sport and exercise psychology section. Studies such as Johanson and Holme's test on Ruth were foundational in the establishment of the importance of sport psychology as a field, both in the eye of the public and the scientific community.

=== Characteristics of behavioral sport psychology ===
The first characteristic of behavioral sport psychology involves identifying target behaviors of athletes and coaches to be improved, defining those behaviors in a way so that they can be reliably measured, and using changes in the behavioral measure as the best indicator of the extent to which the recipient of an intervention is being helped (Martin, 2011).

A second characteristic is that behavioral psychology treatment procedures and techniques are based on the principles and procedures of Pavlovian (or respondent) and operant conditioning and are ways of rearranging the stimuli that occur as antecedents and consequences of an athlete's behavior.

The third characteristic is that many of the interventions with athletes have been developed by practitioners with a cognitive–behavioral orientation. Cognitive–behavior therapy typically focuses on cognitive processes frequently referred to as believing, thinking, expecting, and perceiving.

The fourth characteristic is that researchers have relied heavily on the use of single-subject research designs to evaluate interventions in sport settings, including the following:

(a) a focus on individual athletic performance across several practices and competitions;

(b) acceptability by athletes and coaches because no control group is needed, few participants are needed, and sooner or later all participants receive the intervention;

(c) easy adaptability to assess a variety of interventions in practices and competitions; and

(d) effectiveness assessed through direct measures of sport-specific behaviors or outcomes of behaviors.

The fifth characteristic of a behavioral approach is to place a high value on accountability for everyone involved in the design, implementation, and evaluation of an intervention (Martin & Pear, 2011).

=== Social validation in sport psychology ===
In ABA, the term social validation refers to procedures to ensure that the techniques employed by a practitioner are selected and applied in the best interests of the clients.

In behavioral sport psychology, social validation requires that the practitioner constantly seek answers to three questions: (a) What do the athletes (and perhaps the coach and parents) think about the goals of the intervention? (b) What do they think about the procedures recommended by the practitioner? (c) What do they think about the results produced by those procedures? Behavior sport psychologists need to be aware of and behave consistently with the set of ethical principles to guide the actions of sport psychologists published in 1995 by the Association for the Advancement of Applied Sport Psychology, which, in 2006, became the Association for Applied Sport Psychology (AASP). These principles of ethics exist with the primary goal of the welfare and protection of individuals, groups, and the public with which the AASP members work. The AASP members make a lifelong commitment to act ethically themselves, encourage ethical behavior in others, and consult with others as needed on ethical concerns.

=== Skill acquisition ===
Each sport requires different range of skills. Knapp (1963) defined skills as the learned ability to bring pre-determined results with maximum certainty, often with the minimum outlay of time, energy or both. As we develop a skill, the error is diminished. An ability describes our innate physical attributes that determine our potential for a given sport. Skill acquisition engages experts of their fields (neuroscience, physiology, biomechanics, etc.) to conduct research on how the neuromuscular system functions to activate and coordinate the muscles in the performance of a motor skill. Skill acquisition has evolved from a subfield of psychology to taking on its own interpretation of the brain-behavior theories.

=== Coleman Griffith: "America's first sport psychologist" ===
Coleman Griffith worked as an American professor of educational psychology at the University of Illinois where he first performed comprehensive research and applied sport psychology. He performed causal studies on vision and attention of basketball and soccer players, and was interested in their reaction times, muscular tension and relaxation, and mental awareness. Griffith began his work in 1925 studying the psychology of sport at the University of Illinois funded by the Research in Athletics Laboratory. Until the laboratory's closing in 1932, he conducted research and practiced sport psychology in the field. The laboratory was used for the study of sport psychology; where different factors that influence athletic performance and the physiological and psychological requirements of sport competitions were investigated. He then transmitted his findings to coaches, and helped advance the knowledge of psychology and physiology on sports performance. Griffith also published two major works during this time: The Psychology of Coaching (1926) and The Psychology of Athletics (1928).

Coleman Griffith was also the first person to describe the job of sport psychologists and talk about the main tasks that they should be capable of carrying out. He mentioned this in his work "Psychology and its relation to athletic competition", which was published in 1925. One of the tasks was to teach the younger and unskilled coaches the psychological principles that were used by the more successful and experienced coaches. The other task was to adapt psychological knowledge to sport, and the last task was to use the scientific method and the laboratory for the purpose of discovering new facts and principles that can aid other professionals in the domain.

In 1938, Griffith returned to the sporting world to serve as a sport psychologist consultant for the Chicago Cubs. Hired by Philip Wrigley for $1,500, Griffith examined a range of factors such as: ability, personality, leadership, skill learning, and social psychological factors related to performance. Griffith made rigorous analyses of players while also making suggestions for improving practice effectiveness. Griffith also made several recommendations to Mr. Wrigley, including a "psychology clinic" for managers, coaches, and senior players. Wrigley offered a full-time position as a sport psychologist to Griffith but he declined the offer to focus on his son's high school education.

Coleman Griffith made numerous contributions to the field of sport psychology, but most notable was his belief that field studies (such as athlete and coach interviews) could provide a more thorough understanding of how psychological principles play out in competitive situations. Griffith devoted himself to rigorous research, and also published for both applied and academic audiences, noting that the applicability of sport psychology research was equally important with the generation of knowledge. Finally, Griffith recognized that sport psychology promoted performance enhancement and personal growth.

In 1923, Griffith developed and taught the first sport psychology university courses ("Psychology and Athletics") at the University of Illinois, and he came to be known as "The Father of Sport Psychology" in the United States, as a result of his pioneering achievements in that area. However, he is also known as "The prophet without disciples", since none of his students continued with sport psychology, and his work started to receive attention only from the 1960s

=== Renewed growth and emergence as a discipline ===
==== Early researchers ====
Franklin M. Henry was a researcher who had a positive influence on sport psychology. In 1938, he began to study how different factors in sport psychology can affect athlete's motor skills. He also investigated how high altitudes can have an effect on exercise and performance, aeroembolism, and decompression sickness, and studies on kinesthetic perception, learning of motor skills, and neuromuscular reaction were carried out in his laboratory. In 1964, he wrote a paper "Physical Education: An Academic Discipline", that helped further advance sport psychology, and began to give it its scholarly and scientific shape. Additionally, he published over 120 articles, was a board member of various journals, and received many awards and acclaims for his contributions.

In 1979, Rainer Martens published an article entitled "About Smocks and Jocks", in which he contended that it was difficult to apply specific laboratory research to sporting situations. For instance, how can the pressure of shooting a foul shot in front of 12,000 screaming fans be duplicated in the lab? Martens contended: "I have grave doubts that isolated psychological studies which manipulate a few variables, attempting to uncover the effects of X on Y, can be cumulative to form a coherent picture of human behavior. I sense that the elegant control achieved in laboratory research is such that all meaning is drained from the experimental situation. The external validity of laboratory studies is at best limited to predicting behavior in other laboratories." Martens urged researchers to get out of the laboratory and onto the field to meet athletes and coaches on their own turf. Martens' article spurred an increased interest in qualitative research methods in sport psychology, such as the seminal article "Mental Links to Excellence."

==== The first sport psychology organizations ====
Given the relatively free travel of information amongst European practitioners, sport psychology flourished first in Europe, where in 1965, a meeting was organized by Ferruccio Antonelli, a sport psychologist living in Italy. The meeting was held in Rome, Italy and some 450 professionals primarily from Europe, Australia, and the Americas attended. It became known as the First World Congress of Sport Psychology and gave rise to the International Society of Sport Psychology (ISSP). The ISSP became a prominent sport psychology organization after the Third World Congress of Sport Psychology in 1973, and still exists today as the only international organization that is focused solely on the promotion of sport psychology. Additionally, the European Federation of Sport Psychology, or FEPSAC (Fédération Européenne de Psychologie des Sports et des Activités Corporelles) was formed following a similar meeting known as the first European Congress of sport in 1969, and has since held 15 congresses to discuss the future of sport psychology in Europe.

In North America, support for sport psychology grew out of physical education, and In 1973, The North American Society for the Psychology of Sport and Physical Activity (NASPSPA) grew from being an interest group to a full-fledged organization, whose mission included promoting the research and teaching of motor behavior and the psychology of sport and exercise. In Canada, the Canadian Society for Psychomotor Learning and Sport Psychology (SCAPPS) was founded in 1977 to promote the study and exchange of ideas in the fields of motor behavior and sport psychology. These two organizations would go on to be the leading sources of collaboration among scientists in sport psychology, and in 1985, the NASPSPA became the first organization in North America to sponsor a journal in sport psychology, when the previously unaffiliated The Journal of Sport Psychology, which was founded in 1979, became The Journal of Sport and Exercise Psychology. Also during this same time period, over 500 members of the American Psychological Association (APA) signed a petition to create Division 47 in 1986, which is focused on the collaboration between researchers in the field of Exercise and Sport Psychology.

In 1985, several applied sport psychology practitioners, headed by John Silva, believed an organization was needed to focus on professional issues in sport psychology, and therefore formed the Association for the Advancement of Applied Sport Psychology (AAASP). This was done in response to NASPSPA voting not to address applied issues and to keep their focus on research.

Following its stated goal of promoting the science and practice of applied sport psychology, AAASP quickly worked to develop uniform standards of practice, highlighted by the development of an ethical code for its members in the 1990s. The development of the AAASP Certified Consultant (CC-AAASP) program helped bring standardization to the training required to practice applied sport psychology, and in 2007, AAASP dropped "Advancement" from its name to become the Association for Applied Sport Psychology (AASP), as it is currently known.

=== Coleman Griffith: "America's first sport psychologist" ===
Coleman Griffith worked as an American professor of educational psychology at the University of Illinois, where he first performed comprehensive research and applied sport psychology. He performed causal studies on vision and attention of basketball and soccer players, and was interested in their reaction times, muscular tension and relaxation, and mental awareness. Griffith began his work in 1925 studying the psychology of sport at the University of Illinois, funded by the Research in Athletics Laboratory. Until the laboratory's closing in 1932, he conducted research and practiced sport psychology in the field. The laboratory was used for the study of sport psychology, where factors influencing athletic performance and the physiological and psychological requirements of sport competitions were investigated. He then transmitted his findings to coaches and helped advance the knowledge of psychology and physiology on sports performance. Griffith also published two major works during this time: The Psychology of Coaching (1926) and The Psychology of Athletics (1928).

Coleman Griffith was also the first person to describe the job of sport psychologists and outline the main tasks they should be capable of carrying out. He mentioned this in his work Psychology and its relation to athletic competition (1925). One task was to teach younger and less experienced coaches the psychological principles used by more successful coaches. Another was to adapt psychological knowledge to sport, and the last was to use the scientific method and laboratory research for discovering new facts and principles that could aid professionals in the field.

In 1938, Griffith returned to the sporting world to serve as a sport psychology consultant for the Chicago Cubs. Hired by Philip Wrigley for $1,500, Griffith examined a range of factors such as ability, personality, leadership, skill learning, and social psychological factors related to performance. Griffith made analyses of players while also making suggestions for improving practice effectiveness. He also recommended to Wrigley the creation of a "psychology clinic" for managers, coaches, and senior players. Although offered a full-time position, Griffith declined to focus on his son's education.

Griffith's contributions were notable for emphasizing that field studies, such as athlete and coach interviews, could provide deeper insights into how psychological principles affect competitive situations. He published for both academic and applied audiences, stressing that the applicability of sport psychology research was equally important as generating knowledge. He also promoted performance enhancement alongside personal growth.

In 1923, Griffith developed and taught the first sport psychology university courses (Psychology and Athletics) at the University of Illinois. Due to his pioneering work, he became known as "The Father of Sport Psychology" in the United States. However, he was also called "The prophet without disciples", since none of his students continued in sport psychology, and his work only began receiving attention again in the 1960s.

=== Athletic performance ===
Sport psychology remains influential to athletic performance at all levels. The goal of this area of study is to explore what makes athletes perform the way the way they do. Athletic performance can be measured by self-report or objective data (e.g. player/team statistics). Scholars currently prefer the use of self-reports or a combination of subjective and objective measurements, due to the many factors which go into athletic performance. For example, Athlete's Subjective Performance Scale (ASPS) has been developed and validated with objective data (player's statistics), and found to be a reliable tool for assessing athletic performance in team sports. Much of the research done on athletic performance has been through meta-analysis reviews. These meta-analysis reviews have shown that there is a benefit to using sport psychology techniques to improve an athletes performance. Some influences that have been found to be largely beneficial include task-cohesion and self-efficacy. Being mentally prepared has proven to help athlete's performance, however research has shown that elite athletes and coaches will be hesitant to seek out help from a sport psychologist even if they believed it could help. There are multiple key recommendations for mental practice which improve sport performance, such as practicing imagery and increasing mental and physical repetitions.

=== Youth sport ===
Youth sport refers to organized sports programs for children less than 18 years old. Researchers in this area focus on the benefits or drawbacks of youth sport participation and how parents impact their children's experiences of sporting activities. There are multiple factors as to why youth sport is studied when researching sport psychology, such as life skills, burnout, parenting behavior and coach's behavior. These factors influence whether athlete's in youth sport are affected mentally, whether that be a positive or a negative.

Life skills refer to the mental, emotional, behavioral, and social skills and resources developed through sport participation. Research in this area focuses on how life skills are developed and transferred from sports to other areas in life (e.g., from tennis to school) and on program development and implementation. Burnout in sport is typically characterized as having three dimensions: emotional exhaustion, depersonalization, and a reduced sense of accomplishment. Athletes who experience burnout may have different contributing factors, but the more frequent reasons include perfectionism, boredom, injuries, excessive pressure, and overtraining. Burnout is studied in many different athletic populations (e.g., coaches), but it is a major problem in youth sports and contributes to withdrawal from sport. Parenting in youth sport is necessary and critical for young athletes. Research on parenting explores behaviors that contribute to or hinder children's participation. For example, research suggests children want their parents to provide support and become involved, but not give technical advice unless they are well-versed in the sport. Excessive demands from parents may also contribute to burnout. Coach behavior is a major contributor to how youth athletes experience sports. In research directed at coding behavioral styles of coaches, it has been found that children are more accurate at perceiving coaching behaviors than the coach. This lack of awareness contributes heavily to negative athlete behaviors and burnout.

=== Coaching ===
While sport psychologists primarily work with athletes and focus their research on improving athletic performance, coaches are another population where intervention can take place. Researchers in this area focus on the things coaches can say or do to improve their coaching technique and their athletes' performance.

Motivational climate refers to the situational and environmental factors that influence individuals' goals. The two major types of motivational climates coaches can create are task-oriented and ego-oriented. While winning is the overall goal of sports competitions regardless of the motivational climate, a task-orientation emphasizes building skill, improvement, giving complete effort, and mastering the task at hand (i.e., self-referenced goals), while an ego-orientation emphasizes demonstrating superior ability, competition, and does not promote effort or individual improvement (i.e., other-referenced goals). A task-oriented climate has been found to develop a greater intrinsic, self-determined motivation in athletes compared to an ego-oriented climate. Additionally, an environment with self-improvement as the primary focus creates greater intrinsic motivation than one with winning as the focus.

Effective coaching practices explore the best ways coaches can lead and teach their athletes. For examples, researchers may study the most effective methods for giving feedback, rewarding and reinforcing behavior, communicating, and avoiding self-fulfilling prophecies in their athletes. Coaches influence motivation of athletes mainly through interactional behavior with athletes. Coaches can be perceived by their athletes as autonomy-supporting or controlling. Autonomy-supporting coaches provide structure, as well as being involved and caring towards the athletes. Coaches that are perceived to be controlling instill less intrinsic motivation in their athletes. Motivation is maximized when a coach is perceived to be autonomy-supporting, while providing a high level of training and instruction. Due to these findings, interventions that sport psychologist implement are focused in increasing autonomy-supportive behaviors of coaches.

Coaching philosophy refers to a set of beliefs intrinsic to a coach that guide his or her behavior and experience. The philosophy should facilitate self-awareness, prioritize coaching objectives, and be athlete-centered. Having a philosophy central to the individual will allow a coach to react more efficiently to fast-paced decisions during sports in a systematic and thoughtful way. A coach must be self-aware of their own values in order to monitor if these values align with their thoughts and actions. Often, getting feedback from trusted outside sources is helpful in developing this self-awareness. A coach must also determine and prioritize coaching objectives between winning, athlete well-being, and time outside of the sport. An athlete-centered philosophy emphasizes learning and improvement over winning, which puts the athlete development first. This philosophy should be dynamic as both societal and coaching experiences occur and change.

Mental Coaching is the most used technic to raise performance achievements by enhancing mental toughness. It is predominantly used with elite athletes and high achievers. The Global Performance Index is a tool developed to support this approach. This holistic philosophy (Mind- Body- Heart- Spirit) assesses quickly the mental Health of athletes while measuring their performance progresses.

Communication style is an important concept for sport psychologists to develop with coaches. Communication is a constant role for coaches directed towards athletes, parents, administrators, other coaches, media, and supporters. It mainly comes in the forms of speaking, writing, body language, and listening. Verbal communication occurs through spoken word; however, nonverbal communication contributes hugely to how people perceive a coaches communication. Non-verbal communication comes through actions, facial expressions, body position, and gestures. Coaches must be aware of the words, tone, and behaviors that they use. Research has found that athletes respond best to positive feedback, specific technical instruction, and general encouragement. Sport psychologists focus on developing coaching communication styles that are direct, complete, immediate, and clear, while also being supportive, specific to the athlete, and verbally and non-verbally congruent.

Coaches have become more open to the idea of having a good professional athlete–coach relationship. This relationship is the basis for an effective performance setting.

=== Team processes ===
Sport psychologists may do consulting work or conduct research with entire teams. This research focuses on team tendencies, issues, and beliefs at the group level, not at the individual level.

Team cohesion can be defined as a group's tendency to stick together while pursuing its objectives. Team cohesion has two components: social cohesion (how well teammates like one another) and task cohesion (how well teammates work together to achieve their goal). Collective efficacy is a team's shared belief that they can or cannot accomplish a given task. In other words, this is the team's belief about the level of competency they have to perform a task. Collective efficacy is an overall shared belief amongst team members and not merely the sum of individual self-efficacy beliefs. Leadership can be thought of as a behavioral process that influences team members towards achieving a common goal. Leadership in sports is pertinent because there are always leaders on a team (i.e., team captains, coaches, trainers). Research on leadership studies characteristics of effective leaders and leadership development.

=== Organizational sport psychology ===
Since the early 2000s, there has been a growing trend toward research and practice that better acknowledges the importance of creating sporting environments which enable people to thrive. Organizational sport psychology is a subfield of sport psychology that is dedicated to better understanding individual behavior and social processes in sport organizations to promote organizational functioning. The focus of organizational sport psychology is to develop knowledge that supports the development of optimally functioning sport organizations though the enhancement of day-to-day experiences for those that operate within their sphere of influence. This knowledge can be used in a variety of ways through interventions at the individual, group, or organizational level, and thus organizational sport psychology reflects a systems perspective for academic study and an increasingly necessary aspect of practitioner competency.

=== Motivation in sport ===
Motivation in field of psychology is loosely defined as the intensity and direction in which effort is applied. The direction of motivation refers to how one seeks out situations or if they avoid things that might be challenging. Intensity refers to how much effort one puts into any challenge or situation. Motivation is tied closely to personality and can be categorized as a personality trait. There are three general theories of motivation: participant/trait theory, situational theory, and interactional theory. These theories are similar to those of personality.

Participant/trait theory says motivation consists of the personality traits, desires, and goals of an athlete. For example, some athletes might be extremely competitive and have the desire to improve and win constantly. These athletes would be motivated by competition with themselves and others. Other theories state motivation depends on the situation and environment. For example, some athletes might not feel the desire to work hard when they are on their own, but are motivated by others watching them. Their motivation would be dependent on whether or not there are other people around.

Self-determination theory is based on a number of motives, including but not limited to: amotivation, external regulation, introjected regulation, identified regulation, integrated regulation and intrinsic motivation. Amotivation is a lack of intention to engage in a behavior, often accompanied by feelings of incompetence and a lack of connection between a behavior and the expected outcome. External and introjected regulations showcase a non-self-determined type of extrinsic motivation due to the athlete lacking the feeling that their behavior is choiceful, and therefore feeling as though their behavior is a result of psychological pressure. Identified and integrated regulations represent self-determined types of extrinsic motivation because behavior is initiated out of choice but not necessarily perceived as enjoyable. Intrinsic motivation comes from within, is fully self-determined, and characterized by interest in and enjoyment derived from the sport.

The Interactional theory combines the ideas of participant/trait and situational, where the level of motivation of an individual depends on his/her traits and the situation at hand. For example, if an athlete is intrinsically competitive, they may feel most motivated when participating in a match against many other people.

Depending on traits and situations, it can be easier for some individuals to find motivation than others. That being said, those who are able to find motivation more easily are not guaranteed success and athletes who struggle can adjust some things to improve their drive. Motivation can be facilitated by coaching or leaders, changing the environment, finding multiple reasons or motives to do something, and being realistic about what is achievable. High achieving athletes are more likely to be motivated to achieve success rather than being motivated to avoid failure.

Reversal theory of motivation states that all human behavior is experienced in eight states, four sets of two. A motivational state from each of the four pairs is present at any time. Reversal theory has supporting research connecting psychological and physiological phenomena to these states. Purposeful reversals from a less desired, or useful, state can increase performance and endurance. Arousal and stress may be utilized in a unique and helpful way with the use of this theoretical framework. The theory has been well supported in studies on several continents and in a variety of sports.

=== Image ===
Visualization has recently gained attention as a popular approach to improving sport performance, the concept was first introduced in the 1970s by Galway. Galway says the most powerful opponent a player faces is their own mind. Visualization is intense imagination in the mind without any action. Athletes often create images in their mind about their competition. They imagine themselves playing well or poorly, rehearsing technical skills, analyzing mistakes, or anticipating the competition. Recent meta-analytic evidence indicates that imagery interventions produce overall medium improvements in sport outcomes (performance, motivational, and affective), and combining imagery with physical practice outperforms physical practice alone.

=== Recovery from injury ===
Sport psychologists may also deal with helping athletes recover from the psychological consequences resulting from injury. Because athletes, especially professionals, are more at risk to injury than other kinds of exercisers, the process of recovering from injury, and the varying effects of different kinds of injuries are an important component of sport psychology research. Additionally, sport psychologist are interested in the differences between athletes that may elicit a stronger psychological reaction to an injury, and who is most at risk for injury. For example, research has found men may be less likely to report concussions than women and could be at higher risk of injury due to their physiology. Regarding psychological outcomes, researchers are interested if the type of sport a person plays, how closely they identify with being an athlete, or the amount of time they have spent playing a sport can influence their mental health, and research also explores what types of mental health outcomes are associated with injury (fear, depression, stress, etc.). As of 2013, sport psychologists have also began to explore the effectiveness of various techniques such as setting goals during rehabilitation, self-talk, or biofeedback techniques.

Injury among athletes has also been proven to negatively impact their mental health. Especially with elite athletes whose job is to play a certain sport, there is a proven negative mental impact to having an injury and not being able to play the sport. There has been limited research in the past on how athletes deal with the burden of getting injured and not being able to play their sport, however the recent research which has been done has shown that injury has caused athletes to have worsening mental health such as depression and anxiety.

=== Burnout ===
Research on athlete burnout has historically been focused on the physical load from training and competitions, in addition to the psychological stress associated with situational pressure to justify the occurrence of the burnout. Traditionally, burnout in athletes is explained by a strenuous work load that is needed to become competitive in sports, with the flip side of this strenuous work being the danger of failing to adapt to training loads, being injured, or ill and therefore experiencing performance issues. Research also claims that occurrence of burnout among athletes are rising, and an athlete's mental health is challenged when experiencing performance issues, injuries, or are ill. These result in potential situational stressors that result in stress related responses such as negative thoughts and emotions. Athlete burnout is explained as a result from an athlete's experienced or believed inability to meet demands in training and competitions, in which the distress is related to the discrepancy between the athlete's expectations to achieve goals and cope with demands.

The concept of athlete burnout is made up of three parts: physical and emotional exhaustion, reduced performance accomplishment, and sport devaluation. The core element, physical and emotional exhaustion, is characterized by fatigue from training and competitions. Reduced performance accomplishment is defined as focusing on the feeling of being unable to reach goals and succeed with training and competitions. Sport devaluation, the third aspect, is characterized by loss of interest and care for sports, which further results in reduced quality of performance.

Burnout can also be caused by continuous training and sport attention stress without physical or mental rest and recovery. It results in staleness, overtraining, and eventually burnout. Staleness is defined as a clear drop in athlete motivation and a plateau in performance. Overtrained athletes often show psychophysiological malfunctions and performance declines. Another factor that adds to burnout could be the feeling of being trapped by circumstances within a sport, which perpetuates the cycles of this burnout.

Coaches and athletes are also very dependent on not only results, but each other. If athletes believe that they are not being pushed, or the opposite, being pushed too hard, burnout is very possible and the drive to continue playing lowers. Also, because athletes are always striving to get to that next level in a sport, once an athlete reaches that level, it is shown that these athletes are more prone to becoming complacent and not feel the need to work as hard, or burning out. This can also happen to coaches at any level. The repetitions which coaches face and similarly to athletes, once they get to the highest level and win at the highest level, they are more prone to burning out because there is nothing in the sport which they have not achieved.

=== Identity beyond sports ===
Identity is built off of one's self-perception of their physical, psychological, and interpersonal characteristics which are rooted in personal experiences, memories, and social influences. Athletic identity is defined as "the degree to which an individual identifies with the athlete role and looks to others for acknowledgement of that role." Athletic identity is developed through acquisition of skills, confidence, and social interaction during sport. Cognitively, it provides a framework for processing information, how an individual copes with career-threatening situations, and inspires behavior consistent with an athlete. The social role can be determined by the perceptions close to the athlete, like family, friends, and teammates. As a form of self-concept, athletic identity provides a way to evaluate competence or worth, which can influence self-esteem and motivation. After spending a majority of their lives training, earning recognition for athletic accomplishments, and integrating in the sports environment, the athletic identity becomes a key component of an individual's identity as a whole. Sport psychologists help empower athletes to explore and access other non-sports related identities in times of transition after the life as an athlete.

Some benefits of an athletic identity include a strong sense of self, increased self-confidence, discipline, and social interactions. There are also health and fitness benefits. Some consequences of a strong athletic identity include having emotional difficulties dealing with injuries because it usually results in inability to play or perform at peak performance, which could result in loss of confidence and increase feelings of helplessness. There can also be difficulty adjusting to life after the end of an athletic career. Since sports is often a source of self worth, it can become difficult to adjust to a life without sports for many athletes, especially those who peak at a young age. This can also lead to alternate career or educational options being considered because individuals with a strong athletic identity do not associate their identities with other activities. Having an overly strong athletic identity can also result in burnout due to overcommitment towards an individual's role as an athlete.

Having a strong athletic identity can have an impact on athletes during their athletic career, as it allows them to focus more on bettering themselves. When athletes who have a very strong athletic identity get injured and are sidelined away from the game, it can lead to anxiety, stress and depression. Such athletes may not have a strong sense of identity outside of the game they have committed themselves to. A similar phenomenon presents itself in retired players who find themselves dealing with a lack of identity outside of their sport. Inversely, athletes can be optimistic about their future post-sports because they will have time to do activities which they never have been able to do before.

=== Self-esteem ===
Self-esteem is the confidence someone has in themselves and their abilities. This is why sport and physical activity as a whole has been proven to provide positive mental health benefits, such as more confidence and higher self-esteem. When athletes succeed in sport, they are more confident in their abilities and their self-worth as a result. Sport can also work inversely with self-esteem and cause athletes to feel worse about themselves. If someone is playing poorly then it is possible the athlete will end up thinking less of themselves and having lower self-worth. Playing sports in general, and doing some form of physical activity already immediately makes people think of themselves as more than which is shown by research.

=== Stress ===
Stress is the process by which people perceive and respond to certain events, called stressors, that they find difficult or threatening. Stress is perceived as an interaction between a person and their environment. Stress can be observed in athletes under the influence of external and internal factors of the sport environment. Some identified stressors included excessive amounts of pressure, spectators, training, competition environment, injuries, physical errors, abilities, self-doubt, watching the opponent, etc. These are just a few of the many stressors an athlete can face in their environment. Research in this context is increasing and multiple studies have shown the importance of sport psychology in improving the performance of coaches and athletes.

=== Role of psychology in student-athletes ===
Pursuing a dual career in sport and school, aka student-athletes are more at risk for overall well-being. With decreased mental health and increased stress levels due to needing to cope with multiple demands. When student-athletes experience higher weekly sport-to-school conflict than usual, they have higher sport-related stress than usual. Student-athletes that experienced higher levels of stress also reported greater sport anxiety while in game of their respective sports. These students must handle the stressors associated with being a student while juggling their sport practices and game experiences. Studies have also found that organized sports can provide opportunities to promote mental health awareness in young athletes and reduce the stigma for mental illness.

A study conducted by Kegelaers et al. in 2022 examined the mental health of student-athletes. The study included a comprehensive review of 159 studies spanning three decades, mostly conducted in North America. The majority of student-athletes in these studies (62.5%) reported ill-health outcomes (e.g. disordered eating, anxiety, depression) with 22.6% of student-athletes reporting positive health outcomes (e.g. subjective well-being, psychological well-being). Most variables contributing to mental health issues were related to generic or sport-specific factors, with a limited number of studies examining dual-career specific factors (such as enrolling in collegiate sports and academics at the same time).

=== Professional sports ===
In professional sports, the role of a sport psychologist is subject to change. Roles can change based on the employment of staff within the organization from management to coaching staff. Examples of services performed include: performance enhancement services, clinical or counseling services, psychological testing, and mindfulness training. Through performance enhancement services, psychologists help professional athletes with self-regulation to enhancing team cohesion. Sport psychologists in professional sports organizations also must be well trained in clinical or counseling psychology to help professional athletes deal with personal issues that occur off the field. Sport psychologists must also be trained in psychological testing which is generally used in pre-drafting situations as professional sports teams want to identify psychological factors that could negatively influence a draft candidate's potential. Mindfulness techniques are also a useful tool for sport psychologists to utilize as mindfulness training has been linked with better performance in professional competition.

== Commonly used techniques ==
Below are some of the more common techniques or skills sport psychologists teach to athletes for improving their performance and along with their mental health.

=== Arousal regulation ===
Arousal regulation refers to entering into and maintaining an optimal level of cognitive and physiological activation in order to maximize performance. This may include relaxation if one becomes too anxious or stressed through methods such as progressive muscle relaxation, deep breathing exercises, and meditation, or the use of energizing techniques (e.g., listening to music, energizing cues) if one is not alert enough. This may also include cognitive strategies of relaxation through methods of psychological preparation and positive self-talk. A meta-analysis of 32 studies reported a moderate positive effect of self-talk interventions on sport performance (overall ES ≈ 0.48), with instructional self-talk particularly effective for fine motor tasks.

Progressive muscle relaxation (PMR) refers to the progressive tensing and relaxing of target muscle groups, which can help lower blood pressure, reduce state anxiety, improve performance, and decrease stress hormones. This technique was developed by Edmund Jacobson, who found that people under stress typically displayed increased muscle tension. This technique requires athletes to feel the tension in a muscle group in order to recognize the subsequent relaxation. To successfully use this technique, athletes must allot about twenty to thirty minutes to the activity, tense each muscle group for about four to eight seconds, and ensure that controlled and deep breathing is also applied. This technique can increase feelings of fatigue. Although this technique is not well-suited as a pre-performance method of arousal regulation, it has been found that long-term regular practice can reduce state anxiety and sports-related pain, which is often exacerbated by anxiety.

Deep breathing exercises involve the awareness of one's rhythm of breath and the conscious effort to take slow, deep breaths. Slow deep breathing is a traditional practice in Eastern culture, yoga, and meditation. It is used to activate the parasympathetic nervous system, which helps reduce blood pressure and heart rate. The medically accepted respiratory rate in humans is between 10 and 20 breaths per minute, while slow breathing is between the range of 4–10 breaths per minute. There are various methods to apply slow breathing, such as the 4-7-8 technique. The simplest form is deeply breathing for 1–5 minutes at a slow pace. To enhance the effects, individuals may utilize diaphragmatic breathing simultaneously. To do so, an individual inhales through the nose, allowing his or her belly to rise as the lungs fill. Then, after a momentary pause, release the breath slowly through the mouth or nose. Along with its physiological use, there is evidence that deep breathing can increase a sense of relaxation and reduce anxiety. A study on competitive swimmers found that regular practice of deep breathing exercises can improve lung functions by increasing respiratory endurance.

The use of meditation and specifically, mindfulness, is a growing practice in the field of arousal recognition. The Mindfulness-Acceptance-Commitment (MAC) Theory is the most common form of mindfulness in sport and was formed in 2001. The aim of MAC is to maximize human potential for a rich, full and meaningful life. It includes specific protocol that involve meditation and acceptance practices on a regular basis as well as before and during competition. These protocol have been tested various times using NCAA men's and women's basketball players. In a study done by Frank L. Gardner, an NCAA women's basketball player increased her personal satisfaction in her performances from 2.4 out of 10 to 9.2 out of 10 after performing the specific MAC protocol for several weeks. Also, the effect of mental barriers on her game decreased from 8 out of 8 to 2.2 out of 8 during that same time period as a result of the MAC protocol.

Another study of the MAC protocol performed by Frank Gardner and Zella Moore on an adolescent competitive diver showed that when the MAC protocol is tailored to a specific population, it has the potential to provide performance enhancement. In this case, the vocabulary and examples in the protocol were tailored to be more practical for a 12-year-old. After performed the MAC protocol for several weeks, the diver showed a 13–14% increase in his diving scores. This finding is important because previously the majority of tests performed using the MAC protocol had been on world class athletes.

==== Arousal, anxiety, and stress ====
Although anxiety or stress are often believed to a negative thing, they are actually a necessary response for the body to survive. It is natural for the body to exhibit certain levels of anxiety and stress, however, it becomes a problem when it begins to inhibit activity. Arousal is the physiological and psychological activation of the body in response to an event. Trait anxiety exists in an individual when they experience unusually high response levels to a wide spread of situations that are not threatening. State anxiety is the momentary feeling of nervousness or worry that accompanies the arousal of the body. State anxiety can be defined cognitively, where nervous thoughts and worries occur for a moment. There is also somatic state anxiety, where the body experiences a physiological response to arousal. This sometimes manifests momentarily as a fluttering in the stomach or an elevated pulse. There are four major theories of arousal and anxiety.

Drive theory is an approach that considers anxiety to be a positive asset. In situations where anxiety is high, performance increases proportionally. This theory is not well accepted because it is thought that athletes can be psyched up, but they can also be psyched out. This simply means anxiety can work to motivated some, but it can inhibit others. It is entirely dependent on the individual's personality, so it can not be broadly applied to all athletes.

Inverted U theory is an approach that proposes that the best performance occurs when stress is moderate (not too high or low). This idea is demonstrated in a graph where physiological arousal is plotted against performance. The curve resembles and inverted U because the performance is at its highest value where the arousal is at half of its highest value.

The zone of optimal functioning theory looks at each type of athlete and what level of arousal they need to perform best. This suggests that each athlete requires their own level of stress and arousal to feel motivated and perform well. This theory is specific but difficult to quantify. One proposed model for optimal functioning was proposed by Yuri Hanin. This model focuses on the interaction between natural emotional experience and the repetition of athletics. The combination of these concepts creates an emotional pattern that is stable to each individual. It takes into account positive, negative, optimal, and dysfunctional emotional experiences and how they effect athletic performance. Peak performance is when an athlete experiences this zone of optimal functioning. This stage is described as including dissociation and intense concentration to the point of being unaware of one's surroundings, lack of fatigue and pain, perceptual time-slowing, and feeling power and control. This state cannot be forced to happen, although athletes can develop control over several psychological variables that contribute to achieving peak performance. Sport psychologists try to give athletes the tools to have more control over reaching this peak performance level. These interventions targets controlling state anxiety and arousal level for the individual and task needs to maximize performance abilities. Some of the strategies used include cognitive reappraisal, breathing and relaxation, and hypnosis.

==== Practice-specificity-based model of arousal ====
The "Practice-Specificity-Based Model of Arousal" (Movahedi, 2007) holds that, for best and peak performances to occur, athletes need only to create an arousal level similar to the one they have experienced throughout training sessions. For peak performance, athletes do not need to have high or low arousal levels. It is important that they create the same level of arousal throughout training sessions and competition. In other words, high levels of arousal can be beneficial if athletes experience such heightened levels of arousal during some consecutive training sessions. Similarly, low levels of arousal can be beneficial if athletes experience such low levels of arousal during some consecutive training sessions.

=== Goal setting ===
Goal setting is the process of systematically planning ways to achieve specific accomplishments within a certain amount of time. Research suggests that goals should be specific, measurable, difficult but attainable, time-based, written down, and a combination of short-term and long-term goals. A meta-analysis of goal setting in sport suggests that when compared to setting no goals or "do your best" goals, setting the above types of goals is an effective method for improving performance. According to Dr. Eva V. Monsma, short-term goals should be used to help achieve long-term goals. Monsma also states that it is important to "set goals in positive terms by focusing on behaviors that should be present rather than those that should be absent." Each long-term goal should also have a series of short-term goals that progress in difficulty. For instance, short-term goals should progress from those that are easy to achieve to those that are more challenging. Having challenging short-term goals will remove the repetitiveness of easy goals and will give one an edge when striving for their long-term goals. There are three major types of goals within sport psychology: outcome goals, performance goals, and process goals.

==== Types of goals ====
Outcome goals describe how an individual or team aim to compare to the other competitors. This type of goal is unique because of its nature being ingrained in social comparison. Winning is the most common outcome goal. This type of goal is the least effective because it depends on so many factors that are extrinsic to the individual.

Performance goals are subjective goals that are concerned with personal achievement in a result. These products of performance are based on standard that is subjective for the individual and usually based on numeric measurements. Examples include finishing a race in a certain time, jumping a certain height, or completing a specific number of repetitions.

Process goals are focused on the process of performance. These include execution of behaviors used in the activity of getting to the final product of performance. Examples include breathing control, maintaining body posture, or use of imagery.

=== Imagery ===
Imagery (or motor imagery) can be defined as using multiple senses to create or recreate experiences in one's mind. Additionally, the more vivid images are, the more likely they are to be interpreted by the brain as identical to the actual event, which increases the effectiveness of mental practice with imagery. Good imagery, therefore, attempts to create as lifelike an image as possible through the use of multiple senses (e.g., sight, smell, kinesthetic), proper timing, perspective, and accurate portrayal of the task. Both anecdotal evidence from athletes and research findings suggest imagery is an effective tool to enhance performance and psychological states relevant to performance (e.g., confidence). This is a concept commonly used by coaches and athletes the day before an event. There are two perspectives one can take when using imagery: first person, where one pictures doing the skill his/her self, and third person imagery, where one pictures watching the skill be done by his/her self or another athlete. Athletes can use whichever perspective is most comfortable for them. There are multiple theories of how athletes use imagery.

Psychoneuromuscular theory proposes that athletes activate the muscles associated with an action by picturing themselves doing the action. Activating the neurons that provide input to the muscles is similar to actually practicing the motion.

Symbolic learning theory proposes that athletes recognize patterns in activities and performance. The patterns are then used to create a mental map or model of how to do completes a series of actions.

Vividness theory suggests that athletes use the five senses to take in information while completing an action, and then using the memories of these stimuli to make their mental recreation of the event as realistic as possible.

Controllability theory focuses on the ability of athletes to manipulate images in their mind. This way, they are able to picture themselves correcting a mistake or doing something properly. This is thought to make goals seem more attainable to athletes. This type of imagery can also be harmful, where athletes visualize themselves making a mistake repeatedly.

All strategies of imagery are functional, but each athlete might find one more effective than others. Each strategy can be utilized based on the individual needs and goals of the athlete. In order to be effective, the practice of imagery needs to be inculcated into regular routines as a supplement to physical training. Athletes must learn how to use imagery in a quiet, non-distracting place while picturing realistic and attainable images. Using trigger words can facilitate imagery and bring the athlete closer to the pictured goal.

=== Pre performance routines ===
Pre performance routines refer to the actions and behaviors athletes use to prepare for a game or performance. This includes pregame routines, warm up routines, and actions an athlete will regularly do, mentally and physically, before they execute the performance. Frequently, these will incorporate other commonly used techniques, such as imagery or self-talk. Examples would be visualizations done by skiers, dribbling by basketball players at the foul line, and preshot routines golfers or baseball players use prior to a shot or pitch. These routines help to develop consistency and predictability for the player. This allows the muscles and mind to develop better motor control.

Pre performance routines allow an athlete's mind to relax and go back to something which they know to calm them down. This has resulted in lowering athlete's anxiety and increase their self-belief, which as a result will increase athletic performance because of the lowered anxiety and stress prior to the actual event. For example, when a batter in baseball is up to bat, a lot of the athletes will re-grip their batting gloves, and take a couple of practice swings, not because they need the practice, but because that routine is familiar and will allow them to clear their mind and relax their anxiety. A recent meta-analysis reported small-to-moderate positive effects of pre-performance routines on sport performance, including under pressure.

=== Self-talk ===
Self-talk refers to the thoughts and words athletes and performers say to themselves, usually in their minds. Self-talk phrases (or cues) are used to direct attention towards a particular thing in order to improve focus or are used alongside other techniques to facilitate their effectiveness. These uses are typically fit into two categories of self-talk: instructional and motivational. Instructional self-talk refers to cues that an athlete might use to focus and remind oneself of proper technique. For example, a softball player may think "release point" when at bat to direct her attention, while a golfer may say "smooth stroke" before putting to stay relaxed. Motivational self-talk signifies cues that might build confidence, maximize effort, or reaffirm one's abilities. For example, one might tell themselves to "give it all" or that "I can do it." Research suggests either positive or negative self-talk may improve performance, suggesting the effectiveness of self-talk phrases depends on how the phrase is interpreted by the individual. However, the use of positive self-talk is considered to be more efficacious and is consistent with the associative network theory of Gordon Bower and the self-efficacy tenet within the broader social cognitive theory of Albert Bandura. The use of words in sport has been widely utilized. The ability to bombard the unconscious mind with one single positive phrase, is one of the most effective and easy to use psychological skills available to any athlete.

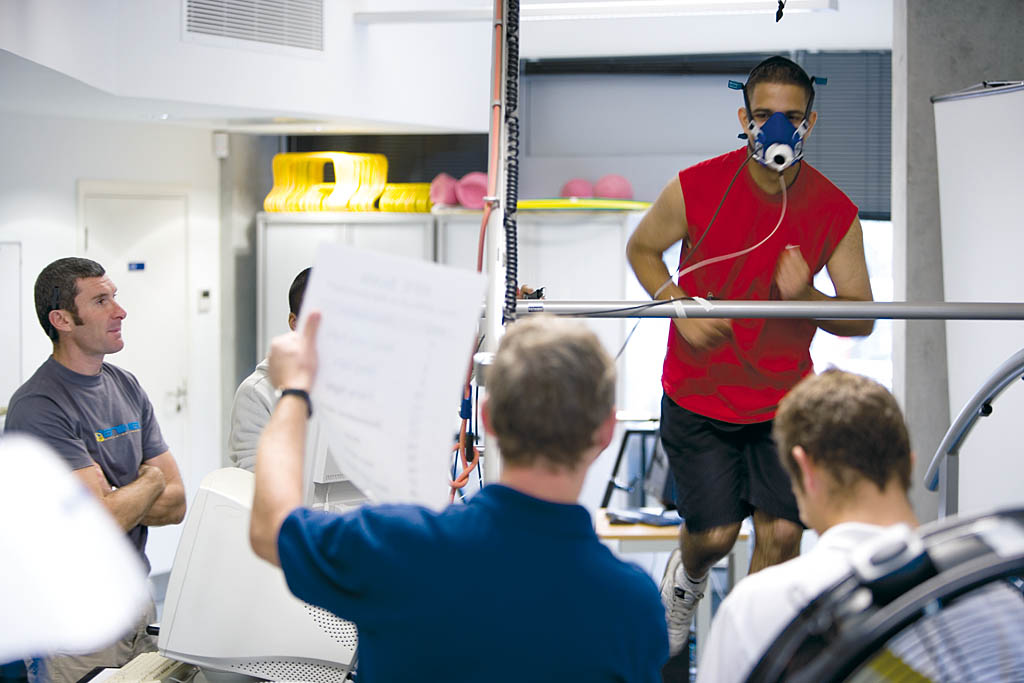
Example of biofeedback

=== Biofeedback ===
Biofeedback uses external technology to measure and make an individual aware of internal physiological processes. There is some evidence that physiological measures, such as heart rate or brain waves, appear to be different in elite athletes than that of the typical person. This is a field that should be further looked into; however, it could have beneficial implications for athletes to be able to monitor and control these physiological measures to maximize performance.

Biofeedback has become increasingly prevalent as the field progresses. It has proven success in peak performance training, such as the psychophysiological preparation of athletes for high-stakes sports competitions (e.g., the Olympic games). In a 2015 study, athletes were subjected to stress tests and given training in biofeedback techniques. One year following the completion of the study, participants were contacted and asked if the techniques learned during the study were still used. All participants indicated that they were still using the biofeedback-psycho-regulation skills and that they believed these skills enhanced both their athletic performance and general well-being.

=== Data analytics and technology ===
As technology advances by the day, "biofeedback" has evolved to an advanced form of data analytic and collection. Digital technologies have begun to influence the topic of sport psychology by allowing for more precise measurement, monitoring of athletes' psychological and physiological states, and if there are connections to each other. The development of wearable devices and sensor based systems have become pocket size and discreet, commonly without the need for a cord connection, allowing for tracking of their physical parameters such as speed, distance, and power, physiological parameters such as heart rate and metabolic rate, and biomechanical parameters such as ground reaction forces and movement patterns. The data collected is often combined with performance metrics to support individualized and group training strategies. Advances in data analysis, including the use of AI and machine learning, continue to contribute to identifying changes in biomarkers (eg, heart rate [HR], HR variability [HRV], and electrodermal activity [EDA]) and can be used to objectively detect stress. At the same time, one of the primary ethical concerns with wearable digital health technology is data collection and storage. As these devices track and monitor personal health data, such as heart rate, activity levels, and sleep patterns, they collect a significant amount of personal data. This data is often stored in the cloud, and third-party access is granted to companies and researchers who may use this data for various purposes. This can lead to concerns regarding data privacy and security.

=== Modeling ===
Modeling is a form of observational learning where an athlete observes another individual around the same level of skill learning perform sport related movements and receive feedback. This has been shown help modify athletes' thoughts, emotions, and behaviors in beneficial ways. In order for this form of learning to work the athlete must be motivated, attentive, able to recall, and willing to try to mimic their observation of the model.

=== Music ===
Music can be used a valuable strategy to help athletes manage arousal levels to increase performance outcomes. Music can be sedative or stimulating. First, music can be sedative by mitigating somatic state anxiety. For instance, unfamiliar relaxing music, unfamiliar arousing music, and familiar arousing music were all shown to have an effect on physiological parameters: galvanic skin response, peripheral temperature, and heart rate. However, in a particular study unfamiliar relaxing music decreased arousal levels more than the other two types of selected music.

Music can be used as a stimulant as well. Athletes will listen to music to get them to an optimal arousal level. Additionally, athletes listen to music to prepare for (or "get into the mood of") events. Music influences arousal levels through the activation of the prefrontal cortex which has a direct influence on the emotional state of an individual. Moreover, it was found that listening to music increases the release of dopamine which illustrates a rewarding component of listening to music. If athletes want to impact arousal levels, they should be aware of the effect tempo has on arousal levels. For instance, athletes should listen to fast tempo music instead of slow tempo music to achieve higher arousal levels. Lastly, music is effective in managing arousal by shifting athlete's attention inward, preventing the athlete from giving into outside distractions that could lead to higher arousal and impact performance negatively. P

== Personality and sport ==
=== Personality characteristics ===
It is beneficial for sport psychologists to understand how athlete personalities systematically vary depending on type of sport played. Research on athlete personalities allows professionals to put in the maximum investment and select specific sports due to a background understanding of the dynamic that they are intervening in. Personality characteristics differ between team versus individual sports, as well as different types of sports.

==== Big Five personality traits ====
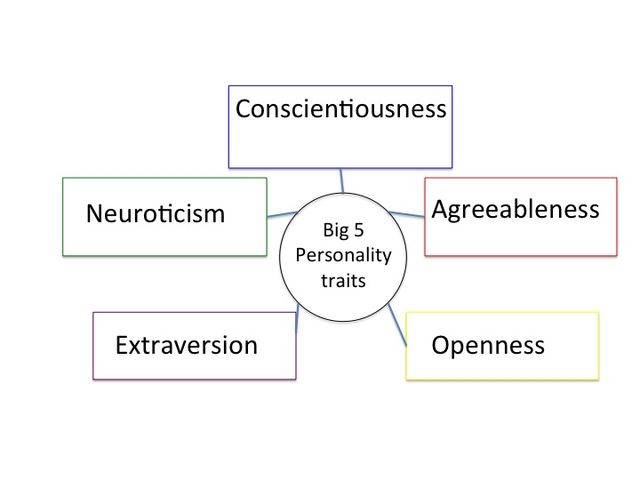
Big Five personality trait visual

Research on the Big Five personality traits (openness, conscientiousness, extraversion, agreeableness, and neuroticism) as well as some other characteristics have differentiated personalities of athletes in individual sports compared to team sports. Athletes in individual sports scored higher on measures of conscientiousness and autonomy. Team-sport athletes scored higher on measures of agreeableness and sociotropy. These characteristics can be explained by the demands of each sport type. Individual sports require athletes to be self-reliant, while team sports require group cohesion in order to be successful. Athletes participating in both team and individual sports score equally on measures of neuroticism, extraversion, and openness. These traits help provide a personality profile for sport psychologist seeking to work with certain types of sports.

==== Sensation seeking ====
Sensation seeking is a phenomenon in which individuals seek novel, complex, or intense activities that provide higher levels of thrill and arousal. This concept is often used to differentiate personalities across various sports. High sensation seekers are more likely to participate in extreme sports such as skydiving, car racing, scuba diving, whitewater sports, and skiing. However, sensation seeking is not necessarily a motive in other high-risk sports such as mountaineering and ocean rowing. These high-thrill sports involve intense speed, excitement, and a perception of risk.

Individuals with moderate levels of sensation seeking tend to engage in sports that are somewhat unpredictable but carry minimal risk, such as basketball, baseball, volleyball, and golf. Low sensation seekers are more likely to participate in sports that require long-term training, discipline, and consistency, including long-distance running, gymnastics, or swimming.

=== Psychopathology ===
Different categories of sports are associated with distinct mental health profiles.

Research suggests that female athletes are at greater risk of developing psychopathologies, particularly anxiety, depression, and eating disorders. Studies indicate that up to 70% of female athletes struggle with eating disorders such as anorexia nervosa or bulimia nervosa, with around 42% of these cases occurring among higher-level competitors.

These issues are most prevalent in aesthetic sports such as ballet or gymnastics, and least common in high-risk or team ball sports. Eating disorders occur more frequently in athletes compared to the general population. Among women, eating disorders are especially common in aesthetic, racing, and fine-motor sports, while being less prevalent in team ball sports. Among men, they are most frequent in high-combat and contact sports. Additionally, problematic eating behaviors tend to arise in sports that emphasize thinness and weight control.

== Exercise psychology ==
Exercise psychology is the study of psychological theories and issues related to physical activity and exercise. It is a sub-discipline of psychology often grouped with sport psychology. For example, Division 47 of the American Psychological Association (APA) represents both exercise and sport psychology. However, APA Division 47 also emphasizes the importance of distinguishing between them, since any unified definition would be too broad.

The link between exercise and psychology has long been recognized. In 1899, William James wrote that exercise was necessary to "furnish the background of sanity, serenity...and make us good-humored and easy of approach". Early research also explored the relationship between exercise and depression, concluding that moderate physical activity was more effective than no exercise in alleviating symptoms. More recent evidence suggests that exercise can alleviate symptoms of avoidance disorders and anxiety, while also improving quality of life.

Interest in exercise psychology grew significantly in the 1950s and 1960s, with presentations featured at the second International Society of Sport Psychology Congress in 1968. In the 1970s and 1980s, William Morgan published influential research on topics such as exercise and mood, anxiety, and exercise adherence. Morgan also founded APA Division 47 in 1986.

As an interdisciplinary field, exercise psychology draws on psychology, physiology, and neuroscience. Major areas of study include the effects of exercise on mental health (e.g., stress, affect, self-esteem), strategies to promote physical activity, exercise patterns across populations (e.g., elderly, obese), theories of behavior change, and challenges such as injury, eating disorders, and exercise addiction.

Recent research also indicates that sport and exercise may enhance general cognitive abilities. When sufficiently cognitively demanding, physical activity can improve cognition, possibly more effectively than either cognitive training or physical exercise alone.

Some research has focused on boredom associated with exercise.

== Mental health in sport psychology ==
Both research and expert discourse indicate that mental health plays a substantial role in an athlete's performance. Sport organizations are advised to recognize athlete mental health as not only a core component of a healthy elite sport system but also as a key indicator of the athlete's effectiveness. Some common stressors that affect an athlete's mental health are injuries, underperforming, and environmental factors. A 2026 study highlighted that junior elite athletes experiencing symptoms of mixed anxiety-depressive disorder often rely on non-productive coping strategies, such as decision avoidance, significantly impacting their competitive behavioral trajectories. With these stressors plus others, the athletes are now prone to deeper mental health issues including anxiety and depression. However, some athletes use the sport as a way of escape, somewhere to hide from the mental issues they are currently facing, whether that be depression and anxiety, or a more complex diagnosis. It is difficult to find evidence pertaining to mental health in athletes because many studies on mental health do not generally focus on mental health in athletes specifically.

== Genetics in sports ==
Genetics has an influence on sports performance, but it is not just the genes that cause enhanced performance; it is a mixture of training and the environment as well. In addition to the environment, athletic performance is also influenced by many genes, not just a single one, making it multifactorial. Dopamine is a chemical messenger in the brain that helps control many processes such as behavior, motivation, movement and thinking. The influence that dopamine has on motivation helps explain why some people are more motivated to participate in intense activities, competitive sports, and train harder. Some dopamine related genes that influence athletic performance by affecting a person's motivation, how they handle rewards in regards to athletic performance, and stress response are dopamine receptor genes: (DRD), catechol-O-methyltransferase gene (COMT), and dopamine transporter gene (DAT1). Higher dopamine levels are connected to a better ability to manage the physical and psychological demands of competitive sports.

Specific genes also influence performance. The gene ACTN3rs1815739 C helps with power performance and strength. It increases reaction speed, affects testosterone, influences muscle growth, fiber composition and nerve responses. The genes AMPD1 rs17602729 C and PPARGCIA rs8192678 G influence endurance through muscle type, how much oxygen is in the blood, and in turn how well the body uses that oxygen. CPNE5rs3213537 G is a gene that helps with sprinting, power, and explosive movement, instead of long endurance. GALNTL6 rs558129 T gene works the same way, it is advantageous for short and powerful activities that are anaerobic which means they do not rely on much oxygen. This gene is best for short distance swimming in athletes. NOS3 rs2070744 T is a gene that is usually found in athletes that are in sports that require top level power versus endurance athletes.

Some genes put athletes at a higher risk of injury such as the gene COL5A1 rs12722 T, which makes someone more likely to have tendon or ligament injuries including tearing your ACL. The gene CKM rs8111989 is linked to a higher risk of muscle injury because it affects a protein called creatine kinase, which is involved in producing energy for muscle contraction and repairing muscle tissue. Dopamine plays a part in injury too since differences in dopamine activity may affect how quickly athletes recover from intense physical activity or injury.

As previously mentioned, specific genes play a role in risk for injuries such as a torn ACL. This particular injury is one of the most common knee injuries in sports, as well as one of the most devastating because many athletes do not return to their sport after the injury occurs. Some specific SNPs, or single nucleotide polymorphisms, were associated with an increased risk of non-contact injuries in ACLs. COL1A2 SNPs (rs42524 and rs2621215) can have an increased risk factor for specifically no-contact ACL tears. Another SNP called COL1A1 was also linked to ACL tears but only in the event that three COL1A2 SNPs (rs412777, rs4252, and rs2621215) were wild-type. There is a suggested gene-gene interaction that occurs in ACL injury risk that could potentially be seen in genetic testing to identify which athletes are genetically at higher risk for an ACL tear.

ACL tears and bone breaks are extremely common athletic injuries, and they often threaten to prematurely end careers. In the case of severe ACL injuries, only about 55% of athletes return to their previous level of competitive play. Even if athletes are able to fully recover, the simple acceptance of these risks is unavoidable, especially in high contact, injury prone sports such as American Football, Hockey, and MMA. Across the board, lower risk individuals will generally be faced with this setback less often, and much of what determines one's risk factor comes down to bone structure and composition. There are several genes responsible for determining these factors, the most important of which is the previously mentioned COLIA1 gene, as well as the COLIA2 gene. These genes are both responsible for regulating Collagen production within the body. Collagen is a key requirement for the growth of bone and structural tissues, making healthy levels essential for success in performance athletics. Mutations to the COLIA1 Gene can result in Ehlers–Danlos syndrome, a condition which weakens connective tissues and causes abnormal scarring.

Additionally, a specific possible genotypic combination in the COLA1 gene may play a substantial role in one's susceptibility to bone breaks, bone dislocations, and ligament injuries. The COLIA1 Sp1 TT genotype is associated with a substantially lower risk of these types of injuries; those in possession of the genotype are around 85% less likely to suffer such injuries when compared to those with the GG genotype.

Other effects of imposed physical stress isolated a specific mutation within the LRP5 gene. This gene regulates mineral density levels within bones, an extremely crucial function for strong continuous bone growth. A certain genotype of this gene correlates with the presence of stress fractures. Results displayed that within the LRP5 gene, the GA genotype of rs2277268 was far more common in individuals who developed stress fractures compared to those without such injuries.

Beyond an athlete's physical performance, genetics has a significant role in the psychological side of sports. These are best displayed through genes that are responsible for mental resilience and cognitive function. The BDNF gene is responsible for encoding neurotrophic factor in the brain, whereas the Val66Met polymorphism (rs6265) is a variant of the BDNF gene. Brain derived neurotrophic factor is a protein that is critical for neuroplasticity. The BDNF genetic variation has been shown to influence both athletic and mental performance, varying from sport to sport. Additionally, the Val/Val genotype of the BDNF rs6265 polymorphism has been linked to more favorable personality traits among martial artists like emotional stability. Overall the BDNF gene variation has been shown to influence the performance of athletes both mentally and athletically from sport to sport. The COMT Val158Met polymorphism (rs4680) is associated with whether someone is an athlete or not, particularly in athletes in power-based sports. This suggests that genes related to cognitive function and stress tolerance can contribute to athletic performance.

Serotonin-related genes have implications for psychological challenges that athletes face. Specifically, the presence of anxiety under competitive pressure. The serotonin transporter gene polymorphism 5-HTTLPR has been connected with traits that are associated with stress response among elite athletes. Certain variants of this gene have been linked to greater emotional reaction and anxiety sensitivity, as well as depression in response to various competitive stressors. A gene commonly associated with athletic performance outcomes is the HTR2A gene, specifically the rs6313 variant. HTR2A is responsible for encoding the serotonin 2A receptor, which deals with mood regulation, stress response, and neural signaling. Athletes who have the HTR2A CC genotype and the CYP1A2 genotype, which is associated with rapid metabolism, displayed improved endurance performance. This demonstrates the bond between Serotonin receptor genetics and how they can influence more than just mood. This indicates that genetic heredity of anxiety regulation and cognitive resilience has a clear precedent within sports psychology.

== See also ==
- Athletic training
- Clinical psychology
- Counseling psychology
- Exercise physiology
- Ideokinesis
- Kinesiology
- Performance psychology
- Personal training
- Sociology of sport
- Sport communication
- Sports medicine
- Sports science
