= Suddhasatwa Basu =

Indian chemical engineer (born 1963)

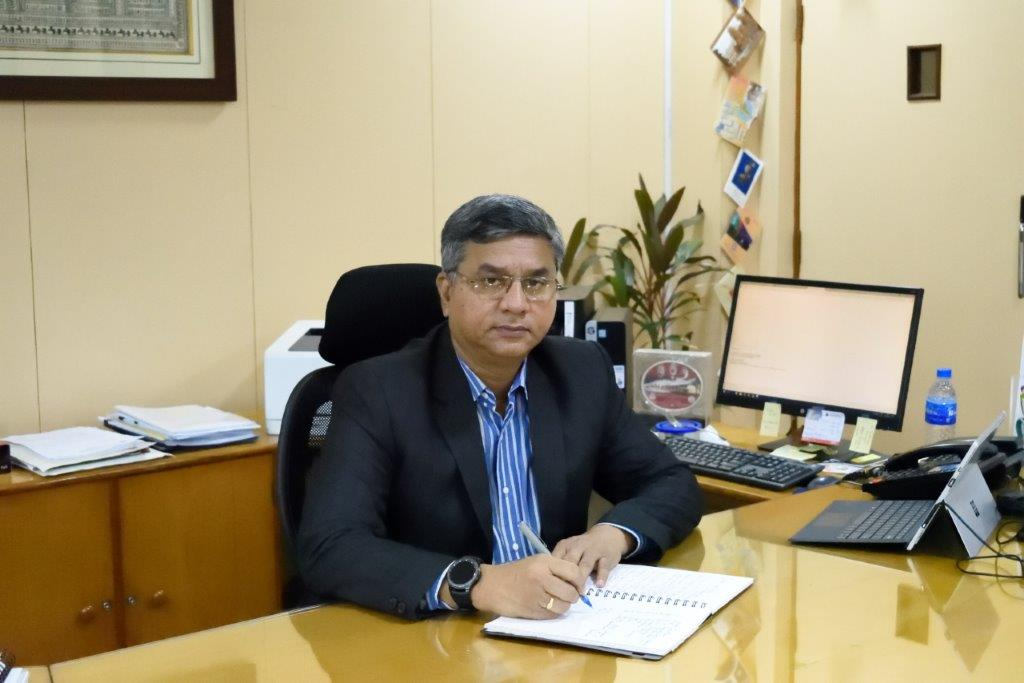
- Basu in 2020
- Born: 1963 (age 62–63)
- Education: University of Calcutta; Indian Institute of Science, Bangalore; University of Alberta
- Known for: Chemical engineering
- Awards: Fellow of Royal Society of Chemistry; Fellow of National Academy of Sciences, India; Herdillia Award
- Scientific career
- Fields: Interfacial & Electrochemical engineering and their application in hydrogen energy and fuel cell technology
- Workplaces: IIT Delhi, New Delhi; AcSIR; Institute of Chemical Technology, Mumbai; University of Newcastle, Australia; University Karlsruhe; University of Newcastle upon Tyne

Sudhhasatwa Basu (born 1963) is an Indian chemical engineer. He is a former director of Council of Scientific Industrial Research - Institute of Minerals and Materials Technology (CSIR-IMMT) in Bhubaneswar, India, and is a professor of chemical engineering, at Indian Institute of Technology Delhi

== Early life and education ==
Suddhasatwa Basu was born on 5 January 1963. He completed a B.Tech from University of Calcutta in 1987 and a Ph.D. from Indian Institute of Science, Bangalore in 1993 in chemical engineering.

== Career ==
Basu worked as postdoctoral research fellow and visiting faculty in the department of Chemical & Material Engineering at University of Alberta, Edmonton, Canada. He has worked on oil sands extraction technology at the University of Alberta. After completion of his research, he joined IIT Delhi, as assistant professor in the Department of Chemical Engineering. He worked as head of the chemical engineering department and associated with R&D, IIT Delhi.

He served director of Council of Scientific Industrial Research - Institute of Minerals and Materials Technology (CSIR-IMMT) from 2018 (on lien from IIT Delhi) in the department of chemical engineering at Institute of Chemical Technology, Mumbai till 2023.

He has visited as a guest professor at universities such as University of Alberta, Canada, University of Newcastle, Australia, University Karlsruhe (KIT). He has done research in the area of Interfacial and Electrochemical Engineering. He has worked on development of direct alcohol and glucose PEM and AEM Fuel Cells, PEMFC diagnostics, solid oxide fuel cells, as the source of renewable energy sources and removal ionic dyes from water by reverse micelles selectively, reuse of dye and solvent, CO_{2} conversion to chemical fuels and dye mineralization by photocatalysis, as environmentally benign technologies.

He has published various articles in high impact factor journals, 28 conferences, and 8 patents.

== Awards ==
He won the Herdillia Award in 2016 and FITT award for best thesis at IIT Delhi in Chemical Engineering.

== Honors ==
He is a visiting fellow of Royal Society, UK, DAAD fellow, UKIERI award, Distinguish Alumni Award from Chemical Engineering Department, Calcutta University, FITT award for best thesis at IIT Delhi.

- Prof. R. D. Desai 80th Birthday Commemoration Medal & Prize, 2012, Indian Chemical Society; Fellow of the Indian Chemical Society, 2012
- Fellow of Institute of Engineers, 2011
- FITT award for best M.Tech. / Ph.D. thesis 2010; prize money shared with student A. Awasthi
- Visiting Fellow, Royal Society, UK, University of Newcastle upon Tyne, UK, 2008
- Fellow of National Academy Sciences of India
- Fellow of Royal Society of Chemistry, UK.

== Editor / Editorial Board Member ==
- Editor in chief, Indian Chemical Engineer, quarterly Journal of Indian Institute of Chemical Engineers, 2018 – present (former Editor, 2006–2007); published by Taylor & Francis UK

== Research interests ==
- Electrochemical storage and renewable energy sources: materials and device development of PEMFC, DAFC, DGFC, SOFC, SOEC, Hydrogen generation – PEM electrolyzer and photochemical water splitting, Li-, Na- ion battery, super-capacitors and their application in portable electronic equipment and rural electrification in the off grid area.
- Interfacial & electro-chemical engineering and micro-fluid mechanics and their application in micro fuel cell, bio-sensing, CO_{2} reduction to chemical fuels, dye removal from water by reverse micelles and reuse, dye mineralization by photo-catalysis and their application to rural sectors.

== Selected bibliography ==
=== Books ===
- Arya Das, Suddhasatwa Basu, Mamata Mohapatra, Transition Metal Oxalates as Potential Futuristic Materials for Efficient Energy Storage Capacity in Oxalate: Structure, Functions and Occurrence, Nova Science Publishers (2020)
- Surya Kanta Das, Shivakumar I. Angadi, Tonmoy Kundu, and Suddhasatwa Basu, Mineral Processing of Rare Earth Ores, Ch 2, in Rare-Earth Metal Recovery for Green Technologies Methods and Applications, Ed. Rajesh Kumar Jyothi, Springer (2020)
- Neetu Kumari, M. Ali Haider and Suddhasatwa Basu, Mechanism of Catalytic and Electrocatalytic CO_{2} Reduction to Fuels and Chemicals (Chapter 2) in Electrochemical Reduction of Carbon Dioxide: Fundamentals and Technologies, Ed. Jinli Qiao, Yuyu Liu, Jiujun Zhang, CRC Press 2016
- Suddhasatwa Basu, Proton Exchange Membrane Fuel Cell Technology: India's Perspective in Energy Material, in Science Based Technologies for Sustainable and Adequate Energy for India, Ed. I. Manna, B. Raj, K. Mudali, Proc Indian Natn Sci Acad 81(4), September 2015 pp. 865–890
- S. Basu (Ed.), Recent Trends in Fuel Cell Science and Technology, Springer, New York (2007) (apart from editing the book contributed two chapters)
- Basu, S., Report on Challenges in Fuel cell Technology: India's Perspective, Dec 1 & 2, 2006, New Delhi (DST)
