= Coleman Griffith =

American sports psychologist

- Born: May 22, 1893
- Died: February 7, 1966 (aged 72)
- Education: Greenville University, University of Illinois
- Occupation: Sports Psychologist
- Employer(s): University of Illinois, Chicago Cubs, Oregon State System of Higher Education
- Known for: Sports Psychology Lab
- Notable work: Psychology of Coaching (1926), Psychology of Athletics (1928)

Coleman Roberts Griffith (May 22, 1893 – February 7, 1966) was an American sport psychologist. Born in Iowa, he is often described as the founder of American sport psychology, though some historians have characterized this status as an "adopted" rather than uncontested title. Griffith studied at Greenville College until 1915, and then studied psychology at the University of Illinois. While at the University of Illinois, Griffith established what he claimed to be the first sports psychology laboratory in the United States. At this time Griffith worked closely with the University of Illinois football team, studying how factors such as psychomotor skills and personality variables related to performance and learning of athletic skills. Due to financial reasons, the Research in Athletics Laboratory eventually was closed, which led to Griffith becoming a sport psychologist with the Chicago Cubs baseball team. Throughout his time with the Chicago Cubs, Griffith examined the players and completed a series of reports for Philip K. Wrigley, the owner of the Chicago Cubs team, with the results eventually summarized in a large report. His ideas were met with resistance, but he helped the Cubs to be successful while there. Griffith ended his career in the department of education at the University of Illinois until his retirement in 1961. Griffith's main contributions to the field of sports psychology, according to historian Christopher Green, came from his publications The Psychology of Coaching (1926) and The Psychology of Athletics (1928). These publications were written during Griffith's time at the University of Illinois and covered topics such as how a coach must have knowledge in athletics, physiology, and psychology to be successful. Much of Griffith's research and publications have become the foundation for the widely growing field of sports psychology and many of his ideas are still used today.

== Early life and education ==
Born in 1893, in Guthrie Center, Iowa, Coleman Griffith was the first of four children. He completed his undergraduate degree at Greenville University in Illinois in 1915, where he met his future wife, Mary Louise Coleman. While at Greenville College, Coleman was freshman class president, a member of male quartet, a member of the baseball and basketball teams, an organizer for various gymnastics events. Coleman received his PhD in psychology in 1920 at the University of Illinois under the supervision of Madison Bentley. His dissertation focused on the vestibular system of the white rat.

== Career ==
In 1922, he was then appointed to assistant professor, and made acting head of the University of Illinois psychology department during the Bentley's sabbatical. He offered an introduction to psychology course with a focus on the interests of an athlete. This led him to offering a course titled "Psychology and Athletics" for the first time in 1923, eventually leading to his first published textbook of General Introduction to Psychology. In 1927, after receiving a Guggenheim Fellowship, Coleman studied at the University of Berlin. Coleman was later named head of the Bureau of Institutional Research. This was an office that collated internal data for the University President, such as student-teacher ratios. He held this position until 1944 and was then named provost of the University of Illinois. He ended his position of provost in 1953, and in 1956 he was named head of the National Education Association's Office of Statistical Information. He retired from the department of education at Illinois in 1962 and worked for the Oregon State System of Higher Education thereafter.

== Research ==
=== University of Illinois ===
==== Athletic Research Laboratory ====
In 1918 Griffith began informally investigating psychological factors related to basketball and football by observing the teams at the University of Illinois. He tested football players' reaction times with a Sanborn reaction-time apparatus in 1920. After seeing these studies, the director of athletics at the university, George Huff, helped convince the university to open an Athletic Research Laboratory. In 1925 Griffith was appointed director of the newly opened Athletic Research Laboratory. The lab had two rooms, one psychological lab and one physiological lab. It also had a workshop and a rat colony. In the lab Griffith investigated psychomotor skills, learning, personality, and how rotation affected equilibrium. To study these things, he developed tests to measure reaction time, muscular tension and relaxation, coordination, learning, and mental alertness. He also interviewed athletes and designed precise interview questions to learn more about these athletes' experiences during competition. The Athletic Research Laboratory was closed in 1932 due to a lack of financial support.

=== Professional sports team ===
==== Chicago Cubs ====
In 1937 the owner of the Chicago Cubs, Philip K. Wrigley, offered Griffith a position with the team. This offer included a budget of roughly $1,500 for equipment and a laboratory in Chicago, including a $350 chronoscope capable of measuring reaction times to the millisecond. Wrigley believed that Griffith could help the team by giving them a psychological advantage. Historian Christopher Green has described the engagement as among the earliest instances of a professional sports team retaining an academic psychologist on an ongoing basis to improve performance.

Initially, Griffith was met with resistance from manager Charlie Grimm, who did not believe in psychologists and told the players not to listen to Griffith. Over the course of the 1938 season, Griffith produced sixteen short reports for Wrigley in which he made a variety of suggestions for making practice drills more similar to actual game play. For instance, he suggested that batting practice be based upon full at-bats so that hitters could gained experience changing strategy with different ball-strike counts. In general, he wanted players to approach practice in the same frame of mind that they have during a game. These suggestions were not implemented. Among Griffith's misjudgments was his assessment of a young Phil Cavarretta, whom he predicted would not advance far in the game; Cavarretta went on to become a three-time All-Star and the National League's Most Valuable Player in 1945. Grimm suffered a "mental breakdown" of some kind during the 1938 season and resigned as manager. He was replaced by the (future Hall-of-Fame) catcher, Gabby Hartnett, whose late-season heroics, hitting the famed "Homer in the Gloamin'" against the rival Pittsburgh Pirates, led the Cubs to a World Series berth against the New York Yankees.

Hartnett, however, proved to be a baseball traditionalist, and was no more open to Griffith's ideas than Grimm had been. At the end of the 1938 season, Griffith wrote a 183-page report for Wrigley, in which he described Hartnett as being "unable to learn." The team's success under Hartnett's leadership that year, though, made it impossible for Wrigley to fire him, even if he had wanted to.

Griffith worked part-time during 1939, but only wrote four short reports and continued dealing with distrust from management. Only one report was written for the team in 1940 before Griffith's work with the team was stopped.

== Major texts and publications ==
=== 1. The Psychology of Coaching (1926) ===
Griffith's main contributions to the field of sports psychology, as identified by historian Christopher Green, came from his publications The Psychology of Coaching (1926) and Psychology and Athletics (1928). His first book, The Psychology of Coaching, was written with the main theme being that a coach must have the qualities of an athlete, physiologist, and psychologist. All chapters were written to be directly relevant to coaches. In this publication Griffith focuses on topics such as the importance of habit formation, and "Morale", which is what he described as an ideal psychological environment where athletes can adopt and grow personal and intellectual traits in relation to athletics. According to Griffith, Morale is the ultimate aim of athletic competition and results in successful "personality and willpower" Griffith built on his writings in the field of sports psychology through the Psychology of Athletics (1928).

=== 2. Psychology and Athletics (1928) and The Athletic Journal ===
Griffith built on his writings in the field of sports psychology through Psychology and Athletics (1928) as well as many contributions to a journal called The Athletic Journal. Griffith wrote about the basic problems and psychological components of athletic performance such as skills, learning, habit, attention, vision, emotion, and reaction time. The Athletic Journal, a periodical founded by John L. Griffith (no relation), was aimed towards writing psychology for coaches. Griffith's contribution to this journal was the foundation of Psychology and Athletics. Griffith's Psychology of Coaching, Psychology and Athletics, and contributions to The Athletic Journal were written during his time researching at the University of Illinois.

== Later life ==
Griffith's professional work in athletics came to an end after the Cubs' season in 1940. Four years later, he became the provost of the University of Illinois; however, this position ended over a conflict with Illinois' professor of physiology, Andrew Ivy. The disagreement stemmed from Ivy's claim to have discovered a cure for cancer called "krebiozen". This conflict caused Griffith to resign by force, although he continued to work in the Department of Education until 1961. As provost, Griffith helped facilitate the 1951 reopening of a sport psychology laboratory at Illinois, closed since 1932, under the direction of Alfred W. Hubbard. After retiring from this position Griffith moved and took a new position in the Oregon State System of Higher Education until he died in 1966.

== Bibliography ==
- 1922: An historical survey of vestibular equilibration, University of Illinois Press
- 1923: General introduction to psychology, MacMillan
- 1926: The Psychology of Coaching, Scribner's
- 1928: The Psychology of Athletics, Scribner's
- 1928: General Introduction to Psychology (revised edition), MacMillan
- 1934: An Introduction to Applied Psychology, MacMillan
- 1935: Introduction to Educational Psychology, Farrar & Rinehart
- 1939: Psychology Applied to Teaching and Learning, Farrar & Rinehart
- 1943: Principles of Systematic Psychology, University of Illinois Press
