= European Federation of Sport Psychology =

European organization for sport and exercise psychology

- Formation: 1968
- Headquarters: Brussels, Belgium
- President: Maurizio Bertollo
- Website: fepsac.com
- Formerly called: European Federation of the Psychology of Sport and Physical Activity

The European Federation of Sport Psychology is a European federation of national organizations in the area of sport and exercise psychology.

The organization is usually called FEPSAC, an acronym of its French name. The organization was founded in 1968. FEPSAC promotes scientific, educational and professional efforts in Europe.

== Member organizations ==
List of current group members:

- Austria: Berufsverband Österreichischer PsychologInnen (BÖP), Österreichisches Bundesnetzwerk Sportpsychologie (ÖBS)
- Arab union: Arab Association for Sport Psychology (AASP)
- Belgium: Vlaamse Verenigung Sport Psychologie (VVSP)
- Croatia: Hrvatska asocijacija sportskih psihologa (HASP), Hrvatsko Psihološko Društvo – Sekcija za psihologiju sporta (HPD)
- Czech Republic: Asociace psychologů sportu ČR, z.s. (APS)
- Finland: Suomen urheilupsykologinen yhdistys (SUPY)
- France: Société Française de Psychologie du Sport (SFPS)
- France: Institut National du Sport, de l'Expertise et de la Performance (INSEP)
- Germany: Arbeitsgemeinschaft für Sportpsychologie in Deutschland e.V. (ASP)
- Greece: Hellenic Society of Sport Psychology (HSSP)
- Italy: Associazione Italiana di Psicologia dello Sport e dell'Esercizio (AIPS)
- Netherlands: Vereniging voor SportPsychologie in Nederland (VSPN)
- Poland: Sekcja Psychologii Sportu Polskiego Towarzystwa Psychologicznego (PTP)
- Portugal: Sociedade Portuguesa de Psicologia do Desporto (SPPD)
- Romania: Asociatia de coaching si psihologie sportiva (ACPS)
- Russia: Russian Society – Association of Sport Psychologist (ASP)
- Slovakia: Slovenská asociácia športovej psychológie (SAŠP)
- Spain: Associació Catalana de Psicologia de l'Esport (ACPE), Federación Española de Psicología del Deporte (FEPD)
- Sweden: Svensk Idrottpsykologisk Förening (SIPF)
- Switzerland: Schweizerische Arbeitsgemeinschaft für Sportpsychologie (SASP)
- Turkey: Turkey Exercises And Sport Psychology Association
- United Kingdom: British Association of Sport and Exercise Sciences (BASES), British Psychological Society – Division of Sport and Exercise Psychology (BPS), Association of Applied Performance Psychology (AAPP)
- European Network of Young Specialists in Sport Psychology (ENYSSP)

== Notable members ==
=== Presidents ===
- 1969–1974: Ema Geron
- 1976–1983: Guido Schilling
- 1984–1991: Paul Kunath
- 1992–1999: Stuart Biddle
- 1999–2003: Glyn Roberts
- 2004–2007: Roland Seller
- 2008– Paul Wylleman

=== Secretaries general ===
- 1969–1970: Eric de Winter
- 1971–1975: Guido Schilling
- 1976–1983: László Nàdori
- 1984–2003: Erwin Apitzsch
- 2004–2007: Paul Wylleman
- 2008– Urban Johnson

== See also ==
- Sport psychology
