= International Society of Sport Psychology =

- Formation: 1965
- President: Robert Schinke
- Ambassador: Chris Harwood
- Managing Council: Alessandro Quartiroli
- Website: issponline.org

The International Society of Sport Psychology (ISSP) is an international, multidisciplinary organization of researchers, psychologists, educators, coaches, administrators, and national organizations in sport and exercise psychology. The organization was founded in 1965. ISSP promotes research, practice, and development of sport and exercise psychology.

== Journals ==
- International Journal of Sport and Exercise Psychology

== Presidents ==
- 1965–1973: Ferruccio Antonelli
- 1973–1985: Miroslav Vanek
- 1985–1993: Robert N. Singer
- 1993–1994: Dennis Glencross
- 1994–1997: Atsushi Fujita
- 1997–2001: Gershon Tenembaum
- 2001–2005: Keith Henschen
- 2005–2009: Dieter Hackfort
- 2009–2013: Sidónio Serpa
- 2013–2017: Gangyan Si
- 2017– Robert Schinke
