= Fabrice Bartolomei =

French neurophysiologist

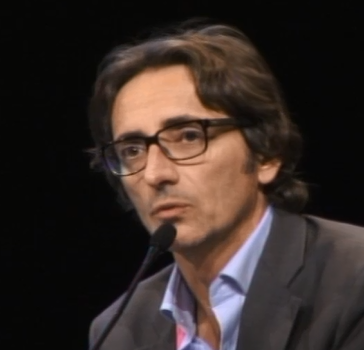

Academic background
- Education: Aix-Marseille University; University of Amsterdam

Academic work
- Discipline: Neurology
- Sub-discipline: Epilepsy
- Institutions: Aix-Marseille University
- Main interests: Presurgical evaluation of patients with drug resistant epilepsy. World leader in the analysis of Stereo-EEG recordings

Fabrice Bartolomei is a French neurophysiologist, and University Professor at Aix-Marseille University (AMU), leading the Service de Neurophysiologie Clinique of the Timone Hospital at the Assistance Publique - Hôpitaux de Marseille, and he is the medical director of the ‘Centre Saint-Paul - Hopital Henri Gastaut’. He is the coordinator of the clinical network CINAPSE that is dedicated to the management of adult and pediatric cases of severe epilepsy and leader of the Federation Hospitalo-Universitaire Epinext. He is also member of the research unit Institut de Neurosciences des Systèmes.

He is the coordinator of the "Improving Epilepsy surgery management and prognosis using Virtual brain technology" (EPINOV) project funded in the context of the RHU3 call.

== Education and early career ==
Bartolomei obtained his medical diploma as neurologist in 1994, followed a PhD in neuroscience in 1997 from the Aix-Marseille University, and had a 1-year post-doctoral fellowship in 2004 at the MEG Center of the University of Amsterdam under the mentorship of C.J. Stam. He is a specialist on epilepsy and mental disorders, and a world leader in the analysis of Stereo-EEG recordings. His current research activities are mainly focused in the presurgical evaluation of patients with drug resistant epilepsy.

== Research work ==
Bartolomei has developed the concept of “Epileptogenic Networks” a dynamic vision of focal epilepsy in order to replace the traditional “focus” vision. This concept of epileptogenic networks is crucial in the context of epilepsy surgery and has been developed from network based approaches in Stereoelectroencephalographic recordings (SEEG) a method developed to record the intracerebral EEG. The research on human epilepsies led by Bartolomei is mainly focused on the characterization of epileptogenic networks in focal epilepsy, particularly in the context of presurgical evaluation in the INS (INSERM 1106) unit. His key contributions can be summarized as follows:

- Source Localization (E/MEG) of Interictal activities in collaboration with Team DYNAMAP INS
- Quantification of Ictal versus Interictal networks in the context of the ANR grant "FORCE"
- Topological changes associated with partial epilepsy in the interictal period from SEEG signals or MRI bold connectivity
- Ictal Networks: definition of different subtypes of premotor/motor seizures and parietal seizures, changes in ictal connectivity and correlated with déjà vu or loss of consciousness
- Role of thalamo-cortical synchrony in seizure termination showing that some patterns of termination are under the influence of thalamic outputs.
- Modulation of Epileptogenic networks: vagal nerve stimulation VNS is efficient in epileptic patients provided that it induces a decrease of functional connectivity, effect of biofeedback in stress related seizures
- Large scale brain networks in silico models in the context of the ANR grant “Vibrations”: in collaboration with the team of F Wendling from LTSI Rennes and the TNG team of Viktor K. Jirsa at the INS: role of macroscale networks in epilepsy, Virtual Brain modeling in focal epilepsy

The work done in collaboration with Viktor K. Jirsa in the context of the Epinext network on the virtual epileptic patient is at the basis of the Epinov project. Bartolomei has also been involved in animal research studies dealing with stress influence on epileptogenesis

He is the co-inventor of the “Epileptogenicity Index, a method for assessing epileptogenicity of brain regions".

He has also discovered the role of the rhinal/entorhinal cortices in the production of déjà vu, a phenomenon obtained from intracerebral stimulations,

The service that Bartolomei leads at the AP-HM has been selected as reference center in the French national network of rare epilepsies.

He authored/co-authored over 260 peer-reviewed publications.
