= Athletic identity =

Athletic identity is a part of self-identity and can be defined as the level, to which one identifies with the role of an athlete. It is a self-concept that is constructed from information processed by the individual and influences both input and output of information related to the self. For athletes and people that are actively involved in sports, athletic identity is a major part of their self and they can satisfy the need of their athletic identity by taking part in sports. Athletic identity increases with the level of involvement in sports, and strong athletic identity correlates positively with athletic achievements, as well as with higher motivation and competitiveness. Changes, such as a decline, in athletic identity facilitate adjustment to everyday life.

Two theories of identity development that can provide a model for athletic identity are structural identity theory and cognitive identity theory. Structural identity theory examines the influences of external components such as society and groups within society (for example, family, friends, coaches, teachers, the media and sport) on the individual. Cognitive identity theory explores the impact of internal components on the individual such as evaluation and interpretation of the identities within the self. Both external and internal components play important roles in the socialization process that contribute to the formation, maintenance, and abandonment of identities such as athletic identity.

== Athletic identity and gender ==
When it comes down to sports, males and females are often separated into two different groups, this is generally due to a difference in physical strength. Aside from this physiological difference, there is often a dominant culture accompanying the sport. For example, in Judo the dominant culture is a male culture. Based on the study done in 2016 by Ronkainen et al. and confirmed by the study done by Palermo and Rancourt in 2019, these factors conflict with the female narrative and are the cause for women to have a harder time creating an athletic identity and this is not likely to change in a short time. The cause of the sustain of this dominating male culture in sports is not limited to male athletes themselves but also includes coaches and women athletes.

Aside from the male and female genders, the creation of an athletic identity could potentially be disrupted by the competing identity of being transgender or non-binary and the existing gender categories in sports. The categories include solely male or female gender, meaning non-binary individuals are automatically subjected to a difficult choice as to which category should they put themselves in. The choice does not only interfere with their gender identity, as choosing a side is the very thing they want to avoid by identifying as non-binary, but may also be a subject of mockery of other sport participants. Transgender and non-binary people are sometimes blamed for not adjusting to the male/female segregation because of the physical advantages of male-to-female transgender women over "natural" women. Because of that, sports organizations prevent the conflict by not allowing them to participate, which in turn, makes it difficult for transgender and non-binary people to keep their athletic identity. Most sports competitions require a match between biological sex and gender identity. Female-to-male transgender athletes also face discrimination because of the belief that some sports are predominantly for males. They may not be taken as serious rivals by other participants and mocked by sports fans.

Emotional aspect of participation in sports for transgender and non-binary people is negative not only because of constant discrimination, but also because of experiencing discomfort and feeling unsafe in facilities such as locker rooms. The most common form of trans-negativity in those places is verbal. In a European study on transgender experience in sports, results showed that almost all individuals experienced insults and other offensive comments, mostly from other contestants and a lot less from coaches and officials. There are also cases of physical abuse caused by trans-negativity. This is one of the reasons why there are still lower participation rates in general physical activity for transgender people compared to cisgender, though the ratio is starting to equalize. Hostility, lack of social networks because of discrimination and missed opportunities because of the biological sex and gender identity alignment requirement led to general decline in self-confidence of non-cisgender participants. In the same study as mentioned above, participants were asked to rate how big of a problem trans-negativity in sports is. The scale was from one to five, five being a "big" problem and one "very small". Most gave a rating of five.

Social support for participating is also lower compared to cisgender sport participants. This affects transgender people psychologically by a lesser perception of their physical self and lower efficiency in sport behaviour. There are some similarities in cisgender and non-cisgender sports participants. The abusers indicated were mostly the same for both groups, with a higher rate of coaches as abusers for cisgender participants. Every trans and non-binary person's experience might differ because of the sport they chose, the accepted norms in a certain place and their general environment.

The challenge presented when forming an athletic identity and the disruption experienced when gender narrative collides with the dominating culture of a sport can lead to mental health disorders. This challenge also results in the upkeep of the dominant culture in the sport.

== Athletic youth ==
Athletic identity starts evolving at an early age and accompanies individuals usually from childhood and their teenage years on, which could contribute to an overidentification with the chosen sport. Social identities are formed during adolescents and having a strong athletic identity can have a huge influence on one's self-conception and personality. Young athletes are often hindered from making social experiences by sacrificing most of their free time for practice. Besides having an intense schedule, building an athletic identity from a young age can benefit adolescents in many ways. Children that grow up in an 'athletic environment' are less vulnerable to mental health illnesses and show a reduced risk for suicide and isolation. An athletic identity helps building a positive and healthy connection to sports in general, hence encouraging a healthy lifestyle and activity.

== Loss of athletic identity ==
=== Causes ===
The causes for losing the athletic identity vary but mostly they are related to a few indicators. Retirement can be named as one of the major causes for the loss of the athletic identity. The retirement transition is distinguishable into normative and non-normative. While the former is anticipated and determined for instance by the athlete's age, graduation and deterioration of performance. The latter is characterized by the surprise and force of retirement. An injury disrupting the athletic performance could be considered as such. Subsequently, the injury can take several forms, namely being temporary or permanent.

The vast majority of athletes start their professional athletic career at a young age. Their occupation is often tied to high schools and colleges, which then implies that the termination of the career is frequently determined by the graduation from high schools or colleges. The athletes can decide personally to terminate their career. Since sportive activities are often linked to competitiveness, the loss of the athletic identity can be caused by deselection as well.

=== Retirement ===
Retirement from sports is often closely followed by a complete conversion of lifestyle spanning from changes in social circle to eating habits to identity. Due to their profession, athletes do not always have control over when and why they retire. Strong Athletic identity during retirement has shown to induce mental illnesses, like depression and anxiety, but also difficulties in adjusting to life after sport. Those that retire involuntarily seem to show a higher athletic identity during retirement than those that actively choose. This might be due to a lack of an adjustment period, where one can prepare for a life without sports. Voluntariness appears to be an important indicator for the decrease in athletic identity, which translates into a smoother retirement. Athletes that pursue other activities next to their career might have more diverse personalities, which allows them to transition easier into retirement or even a new career. Those also show better performance at their sport.

== Athletic identity and aggression ==
Many studies have indicated a positive relationship between athletes and higher levels of aggressive behaviour. Although there is still much speculation into the cause of this relationship. Empirical evidence has been suggested through the athletic identity maintenance model. This model looks at the link between athlete identity, anger and aggressiveness and suggests athlete identity to be playing a key role in the expression of aggressive behaviour among athletes. The main theoretical knowledge that led to the foundation of this model was provided in 1991 through Burks identity process model. According to Burks model, identity processing acts as a "control system" to ensure that an individual's output behaviour is in line with their self perceived identity. Additionally, it claims that an individual will experience distress once this balance is distorted, consequently leading them to change their behaviour in order to restore balance. When an athlete feels their identity as being threatened (for example, a positioning player taking their ball), they may express aggressive behaviour in order to restore their identity as an athlete. Theoretical support provided in 1993 through Wann's self esteem maintenance model looks at the role of sports fans aggressive behaviour towards coaches and opposing teams as a mean to restore the experience of a lowered self-esteem that may occur when their team performs poorly. Further research may suggest that (through the audience effect) sport fan aggressive behaviour may influence and potentially enhance aggressive behaviour amongst athletes. Results of a large multi-cultural analysis with 569 male participants supports the athletic identity maintenance model as a positive association between athlete identity, anger and aggression were found. However, strong influences with respects to cultural differences and the type of sport were found. Further research using electroencephalogram imaging also suggest biological evidence for impaired behavioural inhibition amongst athletes.

== Athletic identity and COVID-19 ==
The COVID-19 pandemic had severe repercussions on many aspects of society like the imposed lockdown that a majority of individuals had to follow. Especially vulnerable were certain groups, among which athletes were salient as they could not perform their sports, in particular team sports. With the purpose of investigating the impact of COVID-19, research has been conducted presenting the relationship between mental health and athletic identity during the lockdowns. In order to study this, it is firstly important to examine the level of importance of the athlete's identity. After several studies researched the link between well-being and athletic identity, it has come to the conclusion that a higher degree of athletic identity is related to lower feelings of depression and, consequently, greater mental health. The results in research from Hagiwara et al. in 2021 propose that when student-athletes are highly aware of their social role, the impact of unanticipated disruptions such as the lockdowns resulting from the COVID-19 pandemic, will be less harmful on their mental health.

Research on the impact of teammate social support was conducted, in order to study the association to mental health in athletes. Social distancing measures imposed during the COVID-19 pandemic could have impeded and lessen the contact with teammates, which might lead to loneliness and social isolation. In 2020, research from Graupensperger et al. evidences that athletes who were able to preserve connections with teammates virtually and received more social support, presented better psychological well-being. Respectively, student-athletes who experienced positive interactions with teammates during lockdowns were likely to present higher feelings of identity because of the provoked perception of belonging to a group. As studies from Graupensperger et al. in 2020 summarises, it has been detected that teammate social interactions and identity conservation are positively associated and that, correspondently, the conservation of identity leads to greater well-being and lower symptoms of depression.

== Treatment of athletic identity loss ==
Depending on the time passed since the incident causing the athletic identity loss, severity of impairment and the age of persons affected, different approaches of treatment have been proposed.

The interpersonal psychotherapy (IPT) was found to be a promising treatment method which focuses on interpersonal relations and conflicts, discussion of feelings of loss and grief as well as role transitions. It accentuates the present instead of the past life of the patient. The relational focus of IPT is especially helpful for athletes playing in a team, as leaving the sport can lead to a huge loss of social contacts formerly kept by the team spirit. IPT is suitable for college athletes as it is short-termed and fits into a busy schedule. Talking about emotional distress caused by the temporal or terminal end of the athletic career seems to be beneficial in any case.

Where applicable, for example in school contexts, sport psychologists and counsellors working preventively to prepare athletes for a life after their sports career can ease the later process of transitioning. Prevention can take the form of presenting possible identities outside the sports context as in formulating alternative career goals. Psychological flexibility is a supportive factor in this case. There is the possibility that people affected turn even more exclusively to their athletic identity when confronted with a thread to it. Others suggest upholding the athletic identity after retirement or injury instead of declaring it as the termination of an old life. This strategy can be seen in former athletes taking over coaching roles as a form of compromise, though this remains to be a controversial approach.

== See also ==
- Early sports specialization – choosing one sport at a young age causes physical and mental harm, including a risk of career-ending injuries and loss of athletic identity
