= Association for Applied Sport Psychology =

Science organization for sport and exercise psychology

- Abbreviation: AASP
- Formation: 1985; 41 years ago
- Headquarters: 8365 Keystone Crossing, Suite 107
- Location: Indianapolis, IN, US
- President: Bob Harmison
- Executive director: Kent Lindeman
- Website: appliedsportpsych.org

The Association for Applied Sport Psychology promotes science and offers accredited certifications in the field of sport and performance psychology. The organization was founded in 1985 and it has over 3000 members in over 50 countries. Sole purpose of organization is to promote research and practice in applied sport and exercise psychology.

== Journals ==
- Journal of Applied Sport Psychology (1989–)
- Journal for Advancing Sport Psychology in Research
- Journal of Sport Psychology in Action
- Case Studies in Sport and Exercise Psychology (2017–)

== See also ==
- Sport psychology
