= Nikos Paragios =

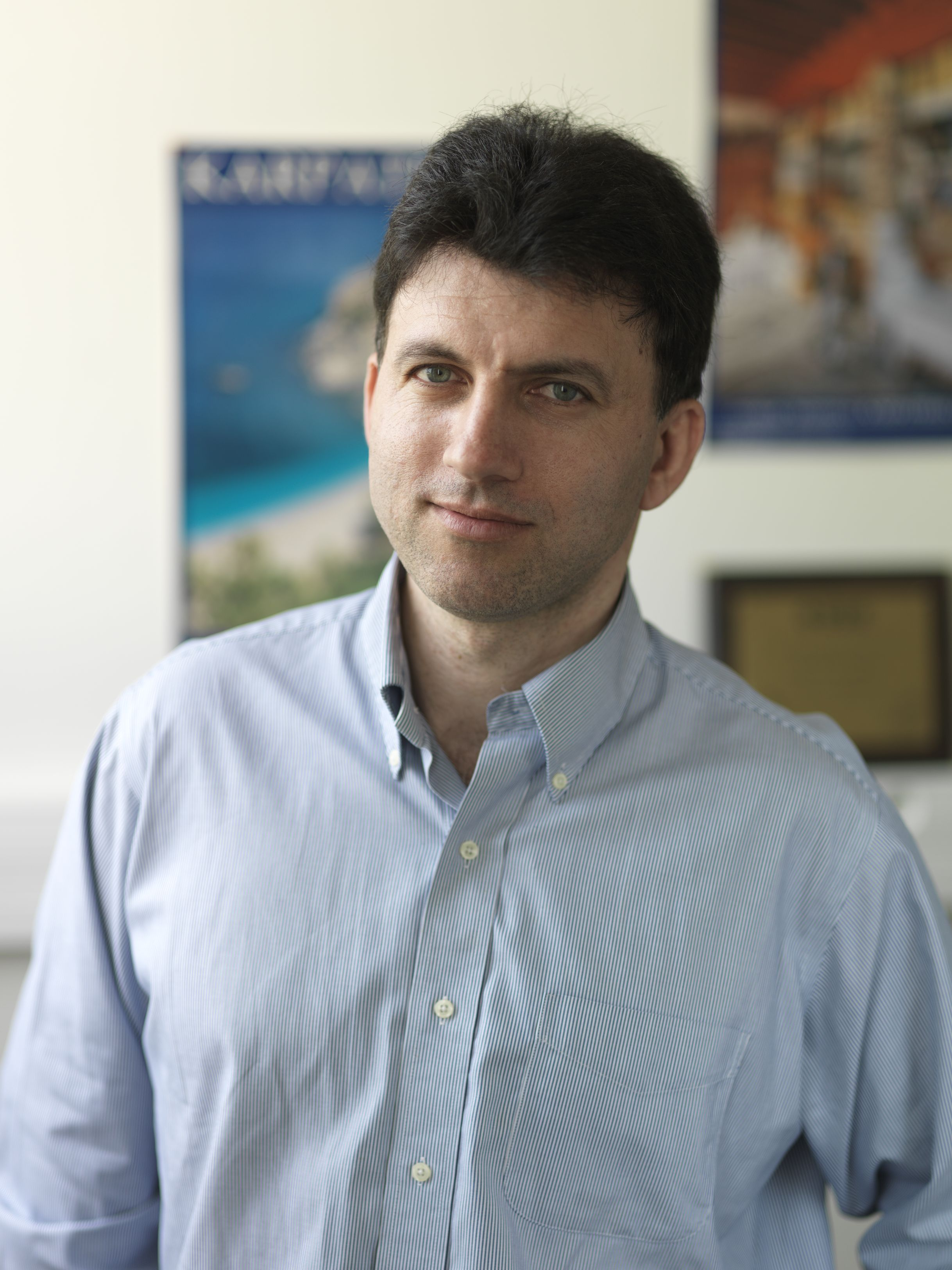
- Nikos Paragios 2011
- Born: Rhodes, Greece
- Known for: Level set Markov random field Image segmentation Image Registration
- Awards: Institut Universitaire de France (2014), European Research Council (2011), IEEE Fellow (2011), Massachusetts Institute of Technology TR35 (2006)
- Scientific career
- Fields: Engineering, Computer Science, Mathematics
- Workplaces: CentraleSupélec, Paris-Saclay University, TheraPanacea

Nikos Paragios (Greek: Νίκος Παραγιός, born at 1972) is a distinguished professor of Applied mathematics at CentraleSupélec, the school of engineering of the Paris-Saclay University and founder, president and chief executive officer of TheraPanacea, an information technology company targeting precision medicine in oncology, neurology and beyond through holistic treatment pathways optimization.

Prior to that, he was senior fellow at the Institut Universitaire de France and affiliated scientific leader at Inria (2007-2017), served as the editor in chief of the Computer Vision and Image Understanding Journal (2012-2022) of Elsevier Publishing House, and has held permanent positions at Siemens Corporate Technology, École des ponts ParisTech as well as visiting positions at Rutgers University, Yale University and University of Houston.
He holds a D.Sc. degree in electrical and computer engineering (2005) from Université Côte d'Azur, a PhD in electrical and computer engineering (2000) from Inria and the University of Nice Sophia Antipolis and a MSc/BSc in computer science (1996/1994) from the University of Crete.

== Work ==
- medical imaging, computer vision, artificial intelligence and machine learning

== Awards ==
- European Research Council Fellow for his contributions to continuous and discrete inference in computer vision, 2011-2016
- IEEE Fellow for his contributions to continuous and discrete inference in computer vision, 2011
- Bodossaki Foundation Scientific Award in applied and engineering sciences, 2008
- Francois Erbsmann Prize (with Ben Glocker), Information Processing in Medical Imaging (IPMI), 2007
- TR35 MIT Technology Review Award, 2006
- ERCIM Cor Baayen Award Award (honorable mention), 2000

== Books ==
- "Geometric Level Set Methods in Imaging, Vision and Graphics" (with Stanley Osher) published in 2003 by Springer
- "Handbook of Mathematical Models in Computer Vision" (with Yunmei Chen and Olivier Faugeras) published in 2005 by Springer
- "Handbook of Biomedical Imaging: Methodologies and Clinical Research" (with James Duncan and Nicholas Ayache) published by Springer in 2015.
