= North American Society for the Psychology of Sport and Physical Activity =

North American organization for sport and exercise psychology

- Formation: 1967
- President: Jacqueline Goodway
- Website: www.naspspa.com

The North American Society for the Psychology of Sport and Physical Activity (NASPSPA) a multidisciplinary association of scholars from the behavioral sciences. Organization is related professions with the goals of promoting the scientific study of human behavior in sport and physical activity, facilitating dissemination of scientific knowledge, and advancing the improvement of research and teaching. The organization is one of the oldest organizations focusing on the psychological aspects of sport and physical activity. The organization focuses on sport psychology, motor learning, motor control, and motor development.

== Journals ==
- Journal of Sport & Exercise Psychology (JSEP)
- Journal of Motor Learning and Development (JMLD)

== See also ==
- Sport psychology
