= National Academy of Sciences, India =

Learned society and academy in India devoted to science

The National Academy of Sciences, India
- राष्ट्रीय विज्ञान अकादमी, भारत
- Abbreviation: NASI
- Formation: 1930; 96 years ago
- Established: 1930; 96 years ago
- Founder: Prof. Meghnad Saha
- Location: 5, Lajpat Rai Road, Mumfordganj, Prayagraj, Uttar Pradesh 211002, India
- Coordinates: 25°29′06″N 81°52′34″E
- Members: 1,765 (2019)
- President: Prof. Vinod K. Singh
- Website: nasi.ac.in
- Formerly called: The Academy of Sciences of United Provinces of Agra and Oudh

The National Academy of Sciences, India, also known as NASI, was established in 1930 and is the oldest science academy of India. It is located in Prayagraj, Uttar Pradesh. Prof. Meghnad Saha was the founder president.

== Fellows ==
- Sneh Bhargava
- Suddhasatwa Basu
- Sudha Bhattacharya
- Chittoor Mohammed Habeebullah
- Vinod Krishan
- Rajender Singh Sangwan
- Ram Parikshan Roy
- Anil Rastogi
- Dipanjan Roy
- Malathi LakshmiKumaran

== Publications ==
Proceedings of the National Academy of Sciences, India was a peer-review scientific journal established in 1930. It split in two parts in 1942.

- Proceedings of the National Academy of Sciences, India Section A: Physical Sciences
- Proceedings of the National Academy of Sciences, India Section B: Biological Sciences

The academy also publishes National Academy Science Letters.

NASI published the Proceedings of NASI, Sec. A & B, each in IV parts and National Academy Science Letters in VI parts, in collaboration with the Springer Nature, every year.

National Academy Science Letters received Impact Factor (IF) as 1.2 in 2023-24 from Thomson Reuters; about 1200 papers were received from thirty countries/regions every year.

PNASI, Sec. A received Impact Factor (IF) as 0.80 in 2023-24 from Thomson Reuters; and about 450 papers were received from twenty-five countries/regions every year.

The PNASI, Sec. B received Cite Score as 2.4 in 2023-24 from Scopus; and about 600 papers were received from thirty-seven countries/regions every year.

Many special publications were released at New Delhi on the occasion of the "Closing Ceremony of the Anniversary Celebrations of 'Ba & Bapu' and Prof. Meghnad Saha". These were the collection of the Lectures delivered (in the memory of these three great personalities of the world) by the distinguished persons in different parts of the country.

Special Issue on "Remote Sensing", which most downloaded journal of the physics in the world,2017. Published in PNASI, Sec-A.

An important book on "Vector Biology and Control" was also published.

== Major Accomplishments (in past few years) ==
The Academy also created two galleries (other than the Ganga-gallery at Prayagraj) on the rivers Brahmaputra and Cauvery respectively at Guwahati (with the partial support of the Govt. of Assam) and Mysuru (with total support of the Govt. of Karnataka), during the years of the report. NASI also undertook several projects on water; and scientifically rejuvenated the baolies (step-wells of about 200 years ago) at Bundelkhand area of MP with the scientific support of MPCOST, Bhopal and the BARC, Mumbai. All these facilities have been dedicated to the Nation.
