= In silico (disambiguation) =

In silico is an expression meaning "performed on computer or via computer simulation".

In silico may also refer to:

- In Silico (Deepsky album), 2002
- In Silico (Pendulum album), 2008

== See also ==
- Insilico Medicine, a biotechnology company
- In silico medicine
- In silico clinical trials
- In silico PCR
