= Plenitude =

Plenitude can refer to:

- Eni Plenitude - an energy firm, owned by Italian firm Eni
- Principle of plenitude - a philosophical concept
- Plenitude (magazine) - a Canadian magazine
- Plénitude - a Michelin three-star restaurant in Paris, France
