= Immunogenicity =

Ability of a foreign substance to provoke an immune response

Immunogenicity is the ability of a foreign substance, such as an antigen, to provoke an immune response in the body of a human or other animal. It may be wanted or unwanted:

- Wanted immunogenicity typically relates to vaccines, where the injection of an antigen (the vaccine) provokes an immune response against the pathogen, protecting the organism from future exposure. Immunogenicity is a central aspect of vaccine development.
- Unwanted immunogenicity is an immune response by an organism against a therapeutic antigen. This reaction leads to production of anti-drug-antibodies (ADAs), inactivating the therapeutic effects of the treatment and potentially inducing adverse effects.

A challenge in biotherapy is predicting the immunogenic potential of novel protein therapeutics. For example, immunogenicity data from high-income countries are not always transferable to low-income and middle-income countries. Another challenge is considering how the immunogenicity of vaccines changes with age. Therefore, as stated by the World Health Organization, immunogenicity should be investigated in a target population since animal testing and in vitro models cannot precisely predict immune response in humans.

Antigenicity is the capacity of a chemical structure (either an antigen or hapten) to bind specifically with a group of certain products that have adaptive immunity: T cell receptors or antibodies (a.k.a. B cell receptors). Antigenicity was more commonly used in the past to refer to what is now known as immunogenicity, and the two terms are still often used interchangeably. However, strictly speaking, immunogenicity refers to the ability of an antigen to induce an adaptive immune response. Thus an antigen might bind specifically to a T or B cell receptor, but not induce an adaptive immune response. If the antigen does induce a response, it is an 'immunogenic antigen', which is referred to as an immunogen.

== Antigenic immunogenic potency ==
Many lipids and nucleic acids are relatively small molecules and/or have non-immunogenic properties. Consequently, they may require conjugation with an epitope such as a protein or polysaccharide to increase immunogenic potency so that they can evoke an immune response.

- Proteins and few polysaccharides have immunogenic properties, which allows them to induce humoral immune responses.
- Proteins and some lipids/glycolypids can serve as immunogens for cell-mediated immunity.
- Proteins are significantly more immunogenic than polysaccharides.

== Antigen characteristics ==
Immunogenicity is influenced by multiple characteristics of an antigen:

- Phylogenetic distance
- Molecular size :- Molecules having bigger size, particularly those greater than10kDa, will be more immunogenic
- Epitope density
- Chemical composition and heterogeneity

- Protein structure
- Synthetic polymers
- D-amino acids

- Degradability (ability to be processed & presented as MHC peptide to T cells)

== T cell epitopes ==
T cell epitope content is one of the factors that contributes to antigenicity. Likewise, T Cell epitopes can cause unwanted immunogenicity, including the development of ADAs. A key determinant in T cell epitope immunogenicity is the binding strength of T cell epitopes to major histocompatibility complexes (MHC or HLA) molecules. Epitopes with higher binding affinities are more likely to be displayed on the surface of a cell. Because a T cell receptor recognizes a specific epitope, only certain T cells are able to respond to a certain peptide bound to MHC on a cell surface.

When protein drug therapeutics, (as in enzymes, monoclonals, replacement proteins) or vaccines are administered, antigen presenting cells (APCs), such as a B cell or Dendritic Cell, will present these substances as peptides, which T cells may recognize. This may result in unwanted immunogenicity, including ADAs and autoimmune diseases, such as autoimmune thrombocytopenia (ITP) following exposure to recombinant thrombopoietin and pure red cell aplasia, which was associated with a particular formulation of erythropoietin (Eprex).

== Monoclonal antibodies ==
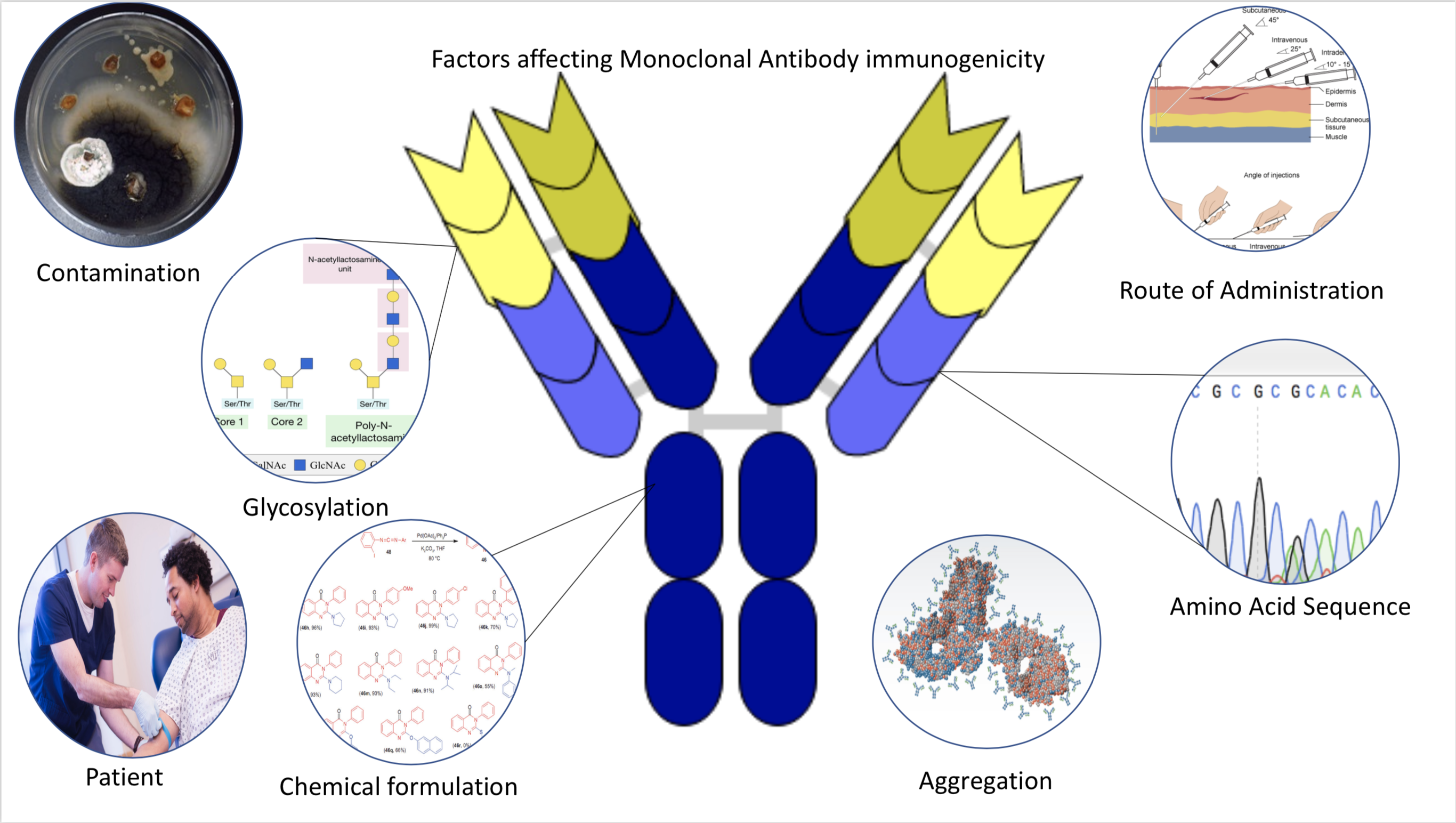
Factors affecting Immunogenicity of Monoclonal Antibodies

Therapeutic monoclonal antibodies (mAbs) are used for several diseases, including cancer and Rheumatoid arthritis. Consequently, the high immunogenicity limited efficacy and was associated with severe infusion reactions. Although the exact mechanism is unclear, it is suspected that the mAbs are inducing infusion reactions by eliciting antibody antigen interactions, such as increased formation of immunoglobulin E (IgE) antibodies, which may bind onto mast cells and subsequent degranulation, causing allergy-like symptoms as well as the release of additional cytokines.

Several innovations in genetic engineering has resulted in the decrease in immunogenicity, (also known as deimmunization), of mAbs. Genetic engineering has led to the generation of humanized and chimeric antibodies, by exchanging the murine constant and complementary regions of the immunoglobulin chains with the human counterparts. Although this has reduced the sometimes extreme immunogenicity associated with murine mAbs, the anticipation that all fully human mAbs would have not possess unwanted immunogenic properties remains unfulfilled.

== Evaluation methods ==
=== In silico screening ===
T cell epitope content, which is one of the factors that contributes to the risk of immunogenicity can now be measured relatively accurately using in silico tools. Immunoinformatics algorithms for identifying T-cell epitopes are now being applied to triage protein therapeutics into higher risk and low risk categories. These categories refer to assessing and analyzing whether an immunotherapy or vaccine will cause unwanted immunogenicity.

One approach is to parse protein sequences into overlapping nonamer (that is, 9 amino acid) peptide frames, each of which is then evaluated for binding potential to each of six common class I HLA alleles that "cover" the genetic backgrounds of most humans worldwide. By calculating the density of high-scoring frames within a protein, it is possible to estimate a protein's overall "immunogenicity score". In addition, sub-regions of densely packed high scoring frames or "clusters" of potential immunogenicity can be identified, and cluster scores can be calculated and compiled.

Using this approach, the clinical immunogenicity of a novel protein therapeutics can be calculated. Consequently, a number of biotech companies have integrated in silico immunogenicity into their pre-clinical process as they develop new protein drugs.

== Prediction methods ==
=== Sequence-based methods ===
Prime, NetMHCpan, MHCnuggets, MHCflurry, DeepNeo, and BigMHC are among the most popular methods to predict peptide-MHC immunogenicity from protein amino acid sequences. They essentially parse the protein sequences as text data, using 1-dimensional convolutional neural networks, recurrent neural networks, or Transformer models.

=== Structure-based methods ===
NeoaPred is a structure-based approach that predicts immunogenicity from structural information. It primarily focuses on cancer neoantigens since it requires mutant–wild-type pairs for immunogenicity prediction.

=== Multimodal methods ===
ImmunoStruct is a multimodal deep learning approach to immunogenicity prediction that fuses information from peptide–MHC sequence, structure, and biochemical properties. Rather than treating protein sequences as text alone, it combines complementary representations of the data to model interactions relevant to antigen presentation and T cell recognition. ImmunoStruct has demonstrated strong predictive performances on infectious disease epitopes (IEDB dataset) and human cancer neoepitopes (CEDAR dataset), and is generalizable to SARS-CoV-2 epitopes and cancer survival prediction. Its multimodal attention mechanism allows the model to differentially weight sequence, structural, and biochemical features for individual peptides, enabling analysis of structural determinants and peptide–MHC interactions associated with immunogenicity.

== See also ==
- Vaccines
- Adaptive immune system
- Immunostimulator
- Host cell proteins
