= Dompé Farmaceutici =

Italian pharmaceutical company

Dompé farmaceutici S.p.A.

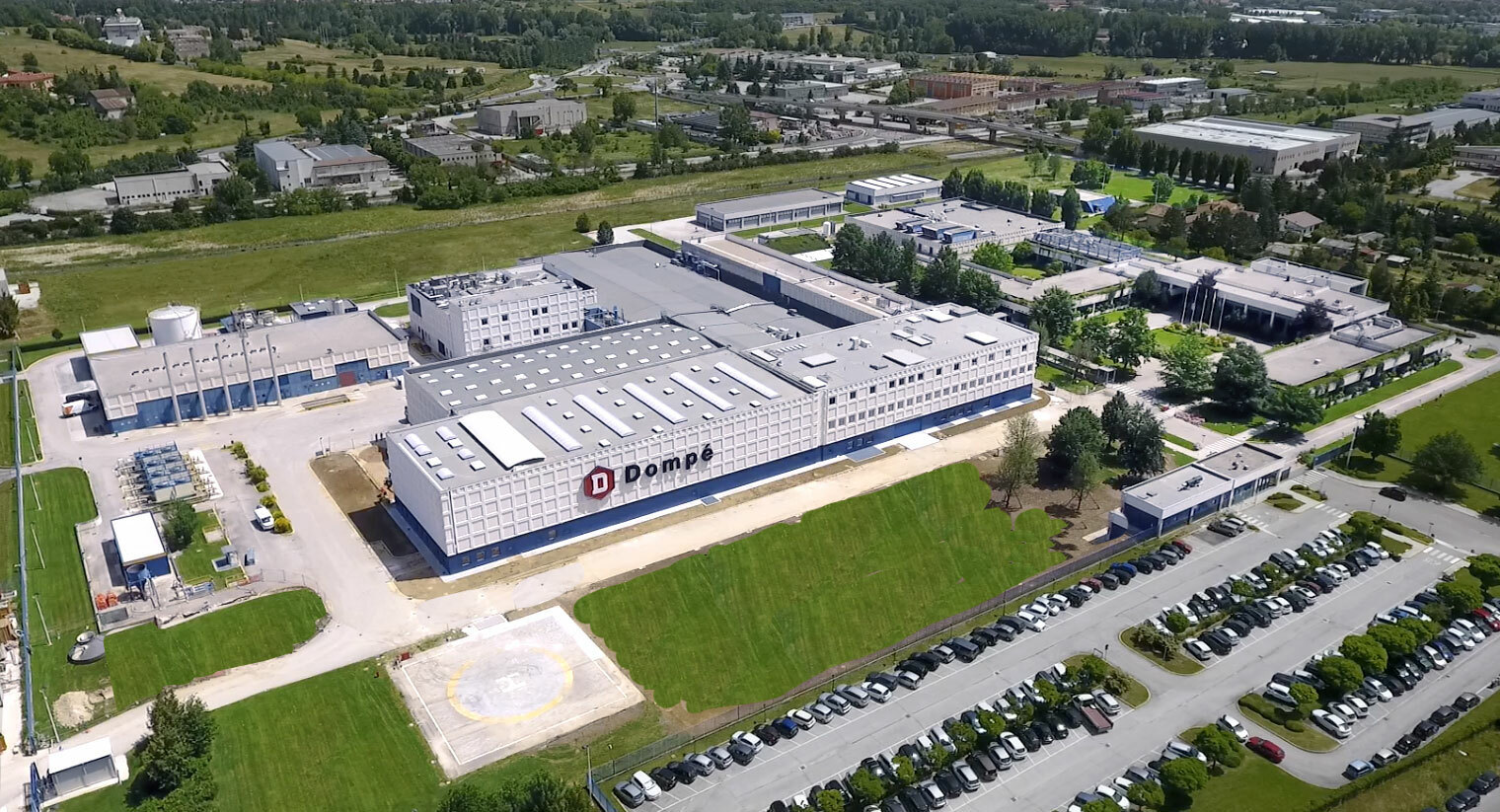
- Aerial view of Dompé production plant in L'Aquila, Italy.
- Type: Private company
- Industry: Pharmaceuticals, biotechnology, healthcare
- Founded: 1940
- Founder: Franco Dompé
- Headquarters: Milan, Italy
- Key people: Sergio Dompé (Executive president); Nathalie Dompé (Co-CEO)
- Revenue: 1.704 billion euro (2025)
- Number of employees: 1,100 (2025)
- Parent: Dompé Holdings
- Website: dompe.com

Dompé farmaceutici is an italian biopharmaceutical company based in Milan. It was founded in 1940. The company specialises on the development and production of primary care drugs, in the biotechnological sector and in research on therapeutic solutions for the treatment of rare diseases.

== History ==
=== Origins ===
The Dompé family’s first steps in the pharmaceutical industry date back to Gian Antonio Dompé. He passed on his interest to his son Onorato (1868–1960), who graduated from the Royal University of Turin and subsequently specialised in London.

Shortly after graduating in Turin, in 1890 he founded with a partner the Dompé-Adami pharmaceutical laboratory in Milan. The premises were equipped with modern machinery for the production of medicines, manufactured according to British standards. Among these products were "Creosotina", obtained from creosote of beech wood and used for respiratory pain, colds and catarrh.

In the following years, the business expanded with the creation of new pharmacies in Milan, Palermo and Ponte Chiasso. In the 1920s, the pharmacies were sold to focus the business on pharmaceutical production, and the laboratories were moved to a large facility in Milan at 12 Via San Martino.

=== Dompé farmaceutici ===
Onorato Dompé's second son, Franco, born in 1911, inherited from his father an interest in pharmaceuticals and graduated in Chemistry and Pharmacy program at the University of Pavia in the 1937. In 1940 he founded the first nucleus of Dompé farmaceutici in Milan, starting an industrial production. The company also began engaging in research activities, focusing on anti-inflammatory, osteoarticular, and respiratory therapies. Some of the drugs produced included Artrosil, Tribenzoica, and Guaiacalcium.

The company headquarters was later relocated to the building on Via San Martino. After World War II, the facility was renovated and inaugurated in 1951, covering an area of 15,000 square meters. Within it, a laboratory was established for the production of medicines in vials, an area in which the company specialised. During the 1950s and 1960s, the business grew in parallel with the economic boom.

=== Development since the 1980s ===
The fourth generation of the family, represented by Sergio Dompé, joined the company in the mid-1970s. Starting in the 1980s, Dompé began to develop alliances with other biopharmaceutical companies. Dompé Biotech was founded in 1988 with the aim of promoting the development of biotechnology in medicine in Italy. Also, collaborations began with Amgen and Biogen. With Amgen, growth factors for white and red blood cells were introduced for the treatment of serious diseases; with Biogen, the first specific therapy for multiple sclerosis was brought to Italy.

In 1993, the company established its production and research hub in L'Aquila, which in subsequent years was expanded with new facilities dedicated to the development of biotechnological products. Specifically, in 2000 the company built a plant for the production of recombinant human nerve growth factor, the protein discovered by Rita Levi-Montalcini that earned her the Nobel Prize.

In 2005 and 2008 the company took part in the creation of two joint ventures with Biogen and Amgen, aimed respectively at researching solutions for multiple sclerosis and developing drugs in the fields of oncology and nephrology. Later, in 2012 Dompé completed the acquisition of Anabasis, a research company focused on NGF in the ophthalmic field; in 2016 it acquired the pharma division of the Bracco Group.

After acquiring the rights for the development and marketing of the protein Nerve Growth Factor in 2010, the company went on to develop the Anabasis product Cenegermin, an eye drop containing recombinant human nerve growth factor, as a treatment for neurotrophic keratitis. Cenegermin received fast track status as well as breakthrough therapy designation and Priority Review from the Food and Drug Administration. Between July 2017 and August 2018 both the EMA and the FDA authorized the commercialization of Cenegermin as the first available treatment for neurotrophic keratitis, which received orphan drug designation. Cenegermin is marketed under the name Oxervate. In 2018 Dompé also opened an office in San Francisco, which became the commercial headquarters of the group’s U.S. operations for Cenegermin.

In 2019, Movendo Technology, Dompé’s rehabilitation robotics subsidiary, signed an agreement with Generali to prevent falls among the elderly.

From 2020, Dompé coordinated the European public–private consortium Exscalate4Cov for intelligent supercomputing activities to accelerate the development of new drugs against Covid-19. Research from Exscalate4Cov identified the molecule Raloxifene, and in 2020 the Italian Medicines Agency authorized a phase 3 clinical trial to evaluate its efficacy and safety in mildly symptomatic adult patients with COVID-19. Also in 2020 the Dompé Foundation was created with the dual purpose of promoting the company’s history and supporting scientific research. In 2021 the company signed an agreement with Leonardo to create the first core of a national digital health security infrastructure with a cloud architecture.

The fifth generation of the family is represented by Nathalie Dompé, Chief Operating Officer and CEO of Dompé Holdings.

== Production, research and development ==
Dompé focuses on the biotechnology sector and on primary care drugs. The therapeutic areas in which the company is active include ophthalmology, pain and inflammation, prevention, the respiratory system, cardio-metabolic diseases, and gastroenterology.

The main production hub is in L'Aquila, Central Italy. Research and development activities are organized through a network of national and international collaborations which, together with L'Aquila and Naples (where a collaboration agreement with the CNR is in place), connects around 200 centres and universities. These include Harvard, Houston Methodist, Stanford, Columbia University, Karolinska Institutet in Sweden, and the National Institutes of Health, with which several clinical studies have been conducted over time.

=== L'Aquila production site ===
Dompé’s hub in L'Aquila is one of the main research and pharmaceutical production centres in Central–Southern Italy and specializes in the production of synthetic medicines and biotechnological active ingredients. For the primary care division it has a production capacity of about 700 million doses and 45 million packs per year.

The facility was built by Foster Wheeler and inaugurated in 1993. In 1996 the first pilot biotechnological production plant was built, followed by new industrial-scale plants between 2012 and 2014. In 2018 the expansion for the new production lines was completed. The research laboratories, production areas, warehouse, plants, general services and administrative offices cover a total area of more than 170,000 m^{2}.

=== Biotechnology ===
In the biotechnology sector, research and development activities focus on rare diseases, particularly in ophthalmology, including Cenegermin, the first authorised treatment based on human recombinant nerve growth factor (rhNGF) and the first biotechnological topical treatment in ophthalmology. Cenegermin is the active ingredient of the orphan drug indicated for patients with neurotrophic keratitis, which affects 250,000 people worldwide. The treatment aims to restore corneal innervation (the cornea is the most densely innervated organ), which can be compromised by disease, surgery, herpetic infections, trauma or burns, and to enable recovery of visual function.

The industrial production process for human recombinant NGF (rhNGF) involves transferring human genetic material into the bacterium Escherichia coli, which then becomes capable of producing fully humanised NGF. The final product is obtained in two steps: fermentation and purification. The first yields proNGF, while the second produces the final molecule. The resulting protein is very similar to that produced by the human body, which supports the development and health of nerve cells.

=== Primary and specialty care products ===
Dompé develops and distributes prescription and over-the-counter drugs medical devices, and vitamin and mineral supplements. The company markets its products in around 40 countries.

== Dompé Foundation ==
The Dompé Foundation is a non-profit organisation based in Milan established in 2020 by Sergio Dompé. Its goal is to support equitable access to higher education and promote scientific careers in the STEM disciplines, with particular attention to the life sciences, ultimately contributing to scientific progress.

The foundation awards scholarships and research grants to students selected on the basis of academic merit and socioeconomic conditions. Its activities are carried out in collaboration with various Italian and international universities. From 2020 to 2025 more than 180 scholarships were awarded to students enrolled in university and post-doctoral programmes, for a total amount of about €11 million.

It is also responsible for managing the Dompé Historical Archive, which preserves and promotes historical documentation on the Italian pharmaceutical industry and the history of Dompé farmaceutici.
