= Versalis =

Italian chemical company

Versalis S.p.A.

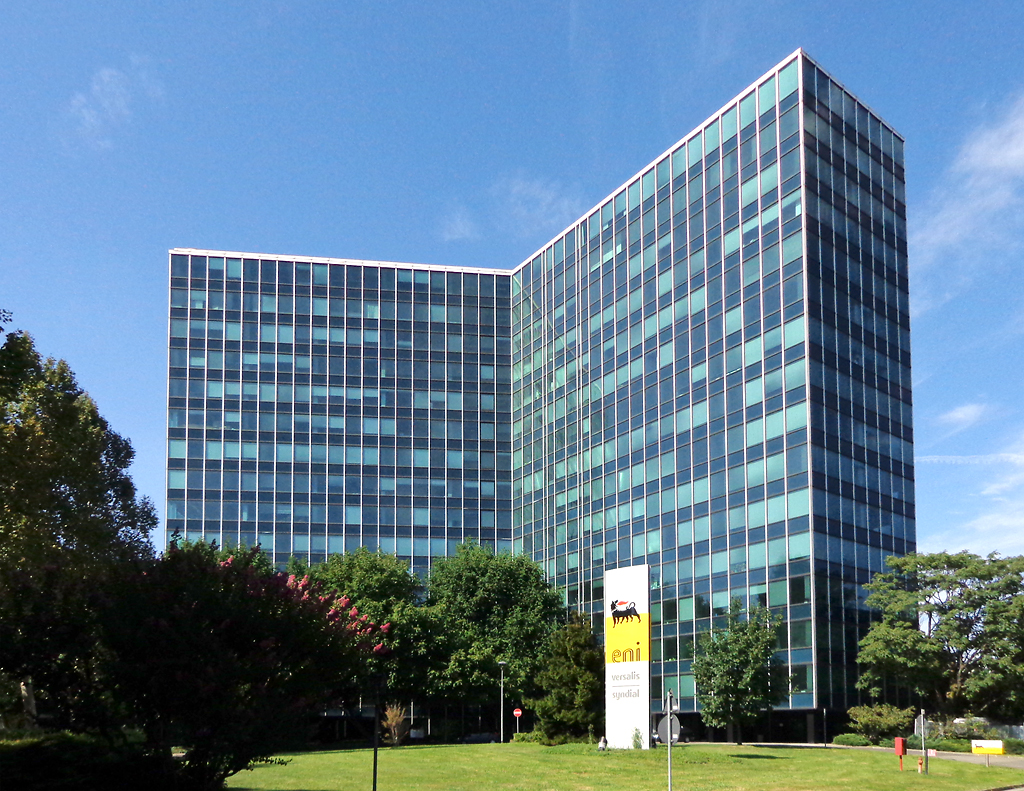
- Versalis headquarters
- Type: Public
- Traded as: BIT: ENI; NYSE: E FTSE MIB Component
- ISIN: IT0003132476
- Industry: Chemicals
- Founded: 1 April 1995; 31 years ago
- Headquarters: San Donato Milanese, Italy
- Area served: Global
- Key people: Marcello Poidomani (chairman); Adriano Alfani (CEO)
- Products: Polyethylene; Styrenics; Elastomers; Intermediates; Polypropylene; Ethylene-vinyl acetate copolymer Oilfield Chemicals; Renewable chemicals Compounds
- Revenue: ▼€3.534 billion (2025)
- Operating income: ▼€−1.425 million (2025)
- Net income: ▼€−1.485 million (2025)
- Total assets: ▼€3.482 million (2025)
- Total equity: ▼€−605 million (2025)
- Number of employees: 7,304 (2025)
- Parent: eni
- Website: www.versalis.eni.com

Versalis S.p.A. (Polimeri Europa till 5 April 2012) is a wholly owned subsidiary of Italian oil supermajor Eni specializing in the production of chemicals. With more than 7,000 employees and a production of about 5.6 million tons of chemical products in 2023, it is by far the largest chemical company in Italy and one of the largest in Europe.

== History ==
The history of Versalis dates back to the Enrico Mattei's management era of Eni. In 1953 Mattei obtained full control of Anic, a company specializing in synthetic fuels by coal hydrogenation, and initiated a massive investment program in order to turn it into the chemical and agrichemical arm of Eni. In 1957, following the discovery of substantial natural gas fields off the Adriatic coast, a major fertilizer and petrochemical plant was completed in Ravenna, than in 1960 started producing PVC. Two years later another large plant was set up in Gela, Sicily, close to some offshore oil fields. Other chemical plants were built in Pisticci, Basilicata, where oil was recently found, and Manfredonia, Apulia, for the production of agricultural chemicals. By the time of the 1973 oil crisis, Anic was a well diversified chemical group with activities in both heavy organic and inorganic chemicals, synthetic rubber, plastics and chemical fibers, but was weak in the production of fine chemicals.

The oil shocks had devastating effects on the chemical sector in Italy and, as a result, the state asked Eni to purchase the assets of bankrupt private chemical companies, such as SIR ( Società Italiana Resine, a large phenolic resins producer with operations in Porto Torres, Sardinia) and Liquichimica (a producer of citric acid with a big plant in Saline Joniche, Calabria). In 1981 all these assets were merged in a new company called Enichimica, rebranded as Enichem in 1985.

In 1987 Raul Gardini, an agri-business tycoon, took over Montedison, at that time the eight largest chemical company in the world. Gardini wanted to reorganize and integrate the company into his sugar and fertilizer empire, but the debt burden he incurred during the takeover rapidly brought Montedison on the threshold of bankruptcy, forcing Gardini to seek state aid. In 1988 a new joint-venture was formed with Eni, called Enimont, in which both companies had 40 per cent of the shares, while 20 per cent was sold on the market. In 1990 Eni bought all Montedison's shares in Enimont, and Montedison withdrew from the chemical sector to pursue a role as an energy company.

In the 1990s Eni, under a heavy debt burden, and plagued with structural problems like a too large number of scattered plants (a legacy of the failed industrialization plans for Southern Italy), with less than optimal size and fixed costs higher than that of its main competitors, was forced to undertook a deep restructuring of Enichem, with enormous economic and social costs: many plants were closed and employment was drastically cut, from 32,963 employees in 1992 to 13,908 in 1999. All non-core assets (like fertilizers and detergents) were sold, mostly to foreign multinationals.

In 2003 Enichem separated its chemical and environmental remediation operations into two new companies, called Polimeri Europa and Syndial (the latter becoming EniRewind in 2019). Finally, Polimeri Europa changed its name to Versalis in 2012.

== Governance ==
As of 2021, the CEO is Adriano Alfani, while Marcello Poidomani has been chairman since September 2024.
