= Neurotrophic keratitis =

- Other names: Neurotrophic keratopathy
- Specialty: Ophthalmology

Neurotrophic keratitis (NK) is a degenerative disease of the cornea caused by damage of the trigeminal nerve, which results in impairment of corneal sensitivity, spontaneous corneal epithelium breakdown, poor corneal healing and development of corneal ulceration, melting and perforation. This is because, in addition to the primary sensory role, the nerve also plays a role maintaining the integrity of the cornea by supplying it with trophic factors and regulating tissue metabolism.

Neurotrophic keratitis is classified as a rare disease, with an estimated prevalence of less than 5 in 10,000 people in Europe. It has been recorded that on average, 6% of herpetic keratitis cases may evolve to this disease, with a peak of 12.8% of cases of keratitis due to varicella zoster virus.

The diagnosis, and particularly the treatment of neurotrophic keratitis are the most complex and challenging aspects of this disease, as a satisfactory therapeutic approach is not yet available.

== Causes ==
The cornea lacks blood vessels and is among the most densely innervated structures of the human body. Corneal nerves are responsible for maintaining the anatomical and functional integrity of the cornea, conveying tactile, temperature and pain sensations, playing a role in the blink reflex, in wound healing and in the production and secretion of tears.

Most corneal nerve fibres are sensory in origin and are derived from the ophthalmic branch of the trigeminal nerve. Congenital or acquired ocular and systemic diseases can determine a lesion at different levels of the trigeminal nerve, which can lead to a reduction (hypoesthesia) or loss (anesthesia) of sensitivity of the cornea. The most common causes of loss of corneal sensitivity are viral infections (herpes simplex and herpes zoster ophthalmicus), chemical burns, physical injuries, corneal surgery, neurosurgery, chronic use of topical medications, or chronic use of contact lenses.

Possible causes also include systemic diseases such as diabetes mellitus, multiple sclerosis or leprosy.

Other, albeit less frequent, potential causes of the disease are: intracranial space-occupying lesions such as neuroma, meningioma and aneurysms, which may compress the trigeminal nerve and reduce corneal sensitivity.

Conversely, congenital conditions that may lead to this disorder are very rare.

== Diagnosis ==
NK is diagnosed on the basis of the patient's medical history and a careful examination of the eye and surrounding area.

With regard to the patient's medical history, special attention should be paid to any herpes virus infections and possible surgeries on the cornea, trauma, abuse of anaesthetics or chronic topical treatments, chemical burns or, use of contact lenses. It is also necessary to investigate the possible presence of diabetes or other systemic diseases such as multiple sclerosis.

The clinical examination is usually performed through a series of assessments and tools:

- General examination of cranial nerves, to determine the presence of nerve damage.
- Eye examinations:
1. Complete eye examination: examination of the eyelids, blink rate, presence of inflammatory reactions and secretions, corneal epithelial alterations.
2. Corneal sensitivity test: performed by placing a cotton wad or cotton thread in contact with the corneal surface: this only allows to determine whether corneal sensitivity is normal, reduced or absent; or using an esthesiometer that allows to assess corneal sensitivity.
3. Tear film function test, such as Schirmer's test, and tear film break-up time.
4. Fluorescein eye stain test, which shows any damage to the corneal and conjunctival epithelium

=== Classification ===
According to Mackie's classification, neurotrophic keratitis can be divided into three stages based on severity:

1. Stage I: characterized by alterations of the corneal epithelium, which is dry and opaque, with superficial punctate keratopathy and corneal oedema. Long-lasting neurotrophic keratitis may also cause hyperplasia of the epithelium, stromal scarring and neovascularization of the cornea.
2. Stage II: characterized by development of epithelial defects, often in the area near the centre of the cornea.
3. Stage III: characterized by ulcers of the cornea accompanied by stromal oedema and/or melting that may result in corneal perforation.

== Treatment ==
Early diagnosis, targeted treatment according to the severity of the disease, and regular monitoring of patients with neurotrophic keratitis are critical to prevent damage progression and the occurrence of corneal ulcers, especially considering that the deterioration of the condition is often poorly symptomatic.

The purpose of treatment is to prevent the progression of corneal damage and promote healing of the corneal epithelium. The treatment should always be personalized according to the severity of the disease. Conservative treatment is typically the best option.

In stage I, the least serious, treatment consists of the administration of preservative-free artificial tears several times a day in order to lubricate and protect the ocular surface, improving the quality of the epithelium and preventing the possible loss of transparency of the cornea.

In stage II, treatment should be aimed at preventing the development of corneal ulcers and promoting the healing of epithelial lesions. In addition to artificial tears, topical antibiotics may also be prescribed to prevent possible infections. Patients should be monitored very carefully since, being the disease poorly symptomatic, the corneal damage may progress without the patient noticing any worsening of the symptoms. Corneal contact lenses can also be used in this stage of the disease, for their protective action to improve corneal healing.

In the most severe forms (stage III), it is necessary to stop the progression towards corneal perforation: in these cases, a possible surgical treatment option is tarsorrhaphy, i.e. the temporary or permanent closure of the eyelids by means of sutures or botulinum toxin injection. This protects the cornea, although the aesthetic result of these procedures may be difficult to accept for patients. Similarly, a procedure that entails the creation of a conjunctival flap has been shown to be effective in the treatment of chronic corneal ulcers with or without corneal perforation.

In addition, another viable therapeutic option is amniotic membrane graft, which has recently been shown to play a role in stimulating corneal epithelium healing and in reducing vascularisation and inflammation of the ocular surface. Other approaches used in severe forms include the administration of autologous serum eye drops.

The best treatment approach for neurotrophic keratitis is still uncertain and further research is needed to compare medical and surgical options. Research studies have focused on developing novel treatments for neurotrophic keratitis, and several polypeptides, growth factors and neuromediators have been proposed. Studies were conducted on topical treatment with Substance P and IGF-1 (insulin-like growth factor-1), demonstrating an effect on epithelial healing.

Nerve Growth Factor (NGF) plays a role in epithelial proliferation and differentiation, as well as in the survival of corneal sensory nerves. Topical treatment with murine NGF has been shown to promote recovery of epithelial integrity and corneal sensitivity in NK patients. A recombinant human NGF (rhNGF) eye drop formulation, cenegermin, has been developed for clinical use and has recently been approved in Europe and by the FDA in August 2018. Recombinant human NGF may help heal corneal epithelial defects.

== See also ==
- Keratitis
- Cornea
- Rare disease
