= Drug repositioning =

Use of existing drugs for new therapeutic purposes

Drug repositioning (also called drug repurposing) involves the investigation of existing drugs for new therapeutic purposes.

== Repurposing achievements ==
Repurposing generics can have groundbreaking effects for patients: 35% of 'transformative' drugs approved by the US FDA are repurposed products. Repurposing is especially relevant for rare or neglected diseases.

A number of successes have been achieved, the foremost including sildenafil (Viagra) for erectile dysfunction and pulmonary hypertension and thalidomide for leprosy and multiple myeloma. Clinical trials have been performed on posaconazole and ravuconazole for Chagas disease.

Other antifungal agents clotrimazole and ketoconazole have been investigated for anti-trypanosome therapy. Successful repositioning of antimicrobials has led to the discovery of broad-spectrum therapeutics, which are effective against multiple infection types.

== Strategy ==
Drug repositioning is a "universal strategy" for neglected diseases due to 1) reduced number of required clinical trial steps could reduce the time and costs for the medicine to reach market, 2) existing pharmaceutical supply chains could facilitate "formulation and distribution" of the drug, 3) known possibility of combining with other drugs could allow more effective treatment, 4) the repositioning could facilitate the discovery of "new mechanisms of action for old drugs and new classes of medicines", 5) the removal of "activation barriers" of early research stages can enable the project to advance rapidly into disease-oriented research.

Often considered as a serendipitous approach, where repurposable drugs are discovered by chance, drug repurposing has heavily benefited from advances in human genomics, network biology, and chemoproteomics. It is now possible to identify serious repurposing candidates by finding genes involved in a specific disease and checking if they interact, in the cell, with other genes which are targets of known drugs. It was shown that drugs against targets supported by human genetics are twice as likely to succeed than overall drugs in the pharmaceutical pipeline. Drug repurposing can be a time and cost effective strategy for treating dreadful diseases such as cancer and is applied as a means of solution-finding to combat the COVID-19 pandemic.

Computational drug repurposing is the in silico screening of approved drugs for use against new indications. It can use molecular, clinical or biophysical data. Electronic health records and real-world evidence gained popularity in drug repurposing, for instance for COVID 19. Computational drug repurposing is expected to reduce drug development costs and time. In 2020, during the COVID-19 pandemic, a European project, Exscalate4Cov conducted drug repurposing experiments, leading to the identification of raloxifene as a possible candidate for treating early-stage COVID-19 patients.

Drug repositioning evidence level (DREL) assessment of repositioning studies
Drug repositioning evidence level	Quality of scientific evidence
0	No evidence; includes in silico predictions without confirmation
1	In vitro studies with limited value for predicting in vivo/human situation
2	Animal studies with hypothetical relevance in humans
3	Incomplete studies in humans at the appropriate dose e.g. proof of concept; few cases from medical records; some clinical effects observed
4	Well-documented clinical end points observed for repositioned drug at doses within safety limits

== Challenges ==
According to a 2022 systematic review, inadequate resources (financial and subject matter expertise), barriers to accessing shelved compounds and their trial data, and the lack of traditional IP protections for repurposed compounds are the key barriers to drug repurposing. There is a lack of financial incentives for pharmaceutical companies to explore the repurposing of generic drugs. Indeed, doctors can prescribe the drug off-label and pharmacists can switch the branded version for a cheaper generic alternative. According to Pharmacologist Alasdair Breckenridge and patent judge Robin Jacob this issue is so significant that: "If a generic version of a drug is available, developers have little or no opportunity to recoup their investment in the development of the drug for a new indication".

Drug repositioning present other challenges. First, the dosage required for the treatment of a novel disease usually differs from that of its original target disease, and if this happens, the discovery team will have to begin from Phase I clinical trials, which effectively strips drug repositioning of its advantages of over de novo drug discovery. Second, the finding of new formulation and distribution mechanisms of existing drugs to the novel-disease-affected areas rarely includes the efforts of "pharmaceutical and toxicological" scientists. Third, patent right issues can be very complicated for drug repurposing due to the lack of experts in the legal area of drug repositioning, the disclosure of repositioning online or via publications, and the extent of the novelty of the new drug purpose.

== Drug repurposing in psychiatry ==
Drug repurposing is considered a rapid, cost-effective, and reduced-risk strategy for the development of new treatment options also for psychiatric disorders.

=== Bipolar disorder ===
In bipolar disorder, repurposed drugs are emerging as feasible augmentation options. Several agents, all sustained by a plausible biological rationale, have been evaluated. Evidence from meta-analyses showed that adjunctive allopurinol and tamoxifen were superior to placebo for mania, and add-on modafinil/armodafinil and pramipexole seemed to be effective for bipolar depression, while the efficacy of celecoxib and N-acetylcysteine appeared to be limited to certain outcomes. Further, meta-analytic evidence exists also for adjunctive melatonin and ramelteon in mania, and for add-on acetylsalicylic acid, pioglitazone, memantine, and inositol in bipolar depression, but findings were not significant. The generally low quality of evidence does not allow making reliable recommendations for the use of repurposed drugs in clinical practice, but some of these drugs have shown promising results and deserve further attention in research.

== See also ==
- COVID-19 drug repurposing research
- Chemoproteomics
- Exscalate4Cov
- Lists of investigational drugs
