= Knight Vinke Asset Management =

American investment company

- Type: Private
- Industry: Investment Management
- Founded: 2003
- Headquarters: MetLife Building; New York City, United States
- AUM: $1 billion
- Website: Official website

Knight Vinke Asset Management is an investment management firm that invests in under-performing bluechip companies, then pushes for institutional changes in those companies to increase share value. As of October 2016, the firm manages approximately $1 billion.

== Operations ==
Knight Vinke reopened a debate about investment banking by publishing an open letter in the Financial Times calling on the Swiss bank UBS to review whether or not it should continue to own its wealth management business under the same roof as its investment bank. Signed by Eric Knight, the letter argued that the excessive risk within the UBS investment banking operations between 2007 and 2009 nearly destroyed the bank and a simplification of the group's structure would help the bank unlock its full value potential.

In February 2013, Darty appointed Eric Knight to the board following a profit warning. Knight Vinke, which has a 25% stake in Darty, said it was frustrated at the pace of change, and would exercise its right to join the board with immediate effect.

Knight Vinke has been an institutional investor in Eni for over 5 years and since 2009 has been calling for the state-controlled Italian oil and gas group to break itself up. It has argued that Eni's ownership of the gas pipeline operator Snam left both with the wrong capital structure; Eni was overgeared for an exploration and production company, while Snam, as a regulated utility, was undergeared.

Knight Vinke played an important role in derailing a major acquisition of VNU. In late 2007, it started to challenge the strategy and governance of HSBC. In June 2009, HSBC's largest shareholder, Legal & General Investment Management (LGIM), became the first major shareholder to offer public support for Eric Knight's activism, and urged HSBC to pay heed and answer questions.

== History ==
In the third quarter of 2016, Knight Vinke posted a return of 14.8% in its flagship fund when the average hedge fund returned 4.19% over the year to date.

In 2016, the firm ranked 7th on Penta's Top 100 Hedge Funds.
