= HPC5 =

Supercomputer

HPC5 is a supercomputer built by Dell and installed by Eni, capable of 51.721 petaflops, and is ranked 9th in the Top500 as of November 2021. It is located in the Green Data Center in Ferrera Erbognone, in Northern Italy. In June 2020, HPC5 ranked 6th in the Green500. HPC5 is an upgrade to the HPC4 system, which was built by Hewlett Packard Enterprise and used by Eni. It is also called as HPC4+.

HPC5 spans over 1,820 Dell EMC PowerEdge C4140 servers, each with two Intel Gold 6252 24-core processors and four Nvidia V100 GPU accelerators. In total, the system comprises 7,280 NVIDIA V100 GPUs.

== See also ==
- Supercomputing in Europe
- Top500
- Green500
