= In silico clinical trials =

An in silico clinical trial, also known as a virtual clinical trial, is an individualized computer simulation used in the development or regulatory evaluation of a medicinal product, device, or intervention. While completely simulated clinical trials are not feasible with current technology and understanding of biology, its development would be expected to have major benefits over current in vivo clinical trials, and research on it is being pursued.

== History ==
The term in silico indicates any use of computers in clinical trials, even if limited to management of clinical information in a database.

== Rationale ==
The traditional model for the development of medical treatments and devices begins with pre-clinical development. In laboratories, test-tube and other in vitro experiments establish the plausibility for the efficacy of the treatment. Then in vivo animal models, with different species, provide guidance on the efficacy and safety of the product for humans. With success in both in vitro and in vivo studies, scientists can propose that clinical trials test whether the product should be made available for humans. Clinical trials are often divided into four phases. Phase 3 involves testing a large number of people. When a medication fails at this stage, the financial losses can be catastrophic.

Predicting low-frequency side effects has been difficult, because such side effects need not become apparent until the treatment is adopted by many patients. The appearance of severe side-effects in phase three often causes development to stop, for ethical and economic reasons. Also, in recent years many candidate drugs failed in phase 3 trials because of lack of efficacy rather than for safety reasons. One reason for failure is that traditional trials aim to establish efficacy and safety for most subjects, rather than for individual subjects, and so efficacy is determined by a statistic of central tendency for the trial. Traditional trials do not adapt the treatment to the covariates of subjects:

- Taking account of factors such as the patient's particular physiology, the individual manifestation of the disease being treated, their lifestyle, and the presence of co-morbidities.
- Compliance, or lack thereof, in taking the drug at the times and dose prescribed. In the case of a surgically implanted device, to account for the variability in surgeons' experience and technique, as well as the particular anatomy of the patient. However, adjusting the evaluation of the study for noncompliance has proved difficult. Such adjustments often bias the results of the study, and so many health authorities mandate that clinical trials analyse the data according to the intention to treat principle.

== Aim ==
Accurate computer models of a treatment and its deployment, as well as patient characteristics, are necessary precursors for the development of in silico clinical trials. The European Medicines Agency (EMA) and the U.S. FDA have both issued guidance supporting the use of modeling, simulation, and virtual patient populations to inform regulatory decisions in drug and medical device development. In such a scenario, 'virtual' patients would be given a 'virtual' treatment, enabling observation through a computer simulation of how the candidate biomedical product performs and whether it produces the intended effect, without inducing adverse effects. Such in silico clinical trials could help to reduce, refine, and partially replace real clinical trials by:

- Reducing the size and the duration of clinical trials through better design, for example, by identifying characteristics to determine which patients might be at greater risk of complications or providing earlier confirmation that the product or process is working as expected.
- Refining clinical trials through clearer, more detailed information on potential outcomes and greater explanatory power in interpreting any adverse effects that might emerge, as well as better understanding of how the tested product interacts with the individual patient anatomy and predicting long-term or rare effects that clinical trials are unlikely to reveal.
- Partially replacing clinical trials in those situations where it is not an absolute regulatory necessity, but only a legal requirement. There are already examples where regulators have accepted the replacement of animal models with in silico models under appropriate conditions. While real clinical trials will remain essential in most cases, there are specific situations where a reliable predictive model can conceivably replace a routine clinical assessment.

In addition, real clinical trials may indicate that a product is unsafe or ineffective, but rarely indicate why or suggest how it might be improved. As such, a product that fails during clinical trials may simply be abandoned, even if a small modification would solve the problem. This stifles innovation, decreasing the number of truly original biomedical products presented to the market every year, and at the same time increasing the cost of development. Analysis through in silico clinical trials is expected to provide a better understanding of the mechanism that caused the product to fail in testing, and may be able to provide information that could be used to refine the product to such a degree that it could successfully complete clinical trials.

In silico clinical trials would also provide significant benefits over current pre-clinical practices. Unlike animal models, the virtual human models can be re-used indefinitely, providing significant cost savings. Compared to trials in animals or a small sample of humans, in silico trials might more effectively predict the behaviour of the drug or device in large-scale trials, identifying side effects that were previously difficult or impossible to detect, helping to prevent unsuitable candidates from progressing to the costly phase 3 trials.

== In radiology ==
One relatively well-developed field of in-silico clinical trials is radiology, where the entire imaging process is digitized. The development has accelerated in recent years following the growth of computer capacity and more advanced simulation models, and is now at the point that virtual platforms are gaining acceptance by regulatory bodies as a complement to conventional clinical trials for new product introductions.

A complete framework for in-silico clinical trials in radiology needs to include the following three components: 1) A realistic patient population, which is computer simulated using software phantoms; 2) The simulated response of the imaging system; 3) Image evaluation in a systematic way by human or model observers.

Computational phantoms for imaging in-silico trials require a high degree of realism because images will be produced and evaluated. To date, the most realistic whole-body phantoms are so-called boundary representation (BREP) phantoms, which are surface representations of segmented 3D patient data (MRI or CT). The fitted surfaces allow for modelling anatomical changes or motion in addition to realistic anatomy. Existing models for generating intra-organ structures are based on mathematical modelling, patient images, or generative adversarial network (GAN) modelling of patient images. Models of pathologies are important for simulating clinical applications targeted on specific diseases. State-of-the-art models are based on segmented lesions with enhancements for structures above the resolution limit of the imaging system using digital pathology or physiological growth models. GAN models have been used to simulate disease as well. In addition to the above, models have been developed for organ and patient motion, blood flow and contrast agent perfusion.

The response of the imaging system is generally simulated with Monte-Carlo or raytracing system models, benchmarked to measurements on physical phantoms. Medical imaging has a long history of system simulation for technology development and proprietary as well as public-domain models exist for a wide range of imaging systems.

The final step of an imaging in-silico trial is evaluation and interpretation of the generated images in a systematic way. The images can be evaluated by humans in ways similar to a conventional clinical trial, but for an in-silico trial to be really effective, image interpretation as well needs to be automized. For detection and quantification tasks, so-called observer models have been thoroughly studied and validated against human observers, and a range of spatial-domain models exist in the literature. Image interpretation based on deep learning and artificial intelligence (AI) is an active research field, and might become a valuable aid for the radiologist to find abnormalities or to make decisions. Applying AI observers in in-silico trials is relatively straightforward as the entire image chain is digitized.

== See also ==
- In silico
- in silico medicine
- Virtual Physiological Human
- Virtual screening
