= In silico =

Latin phrase referring to computer simulations

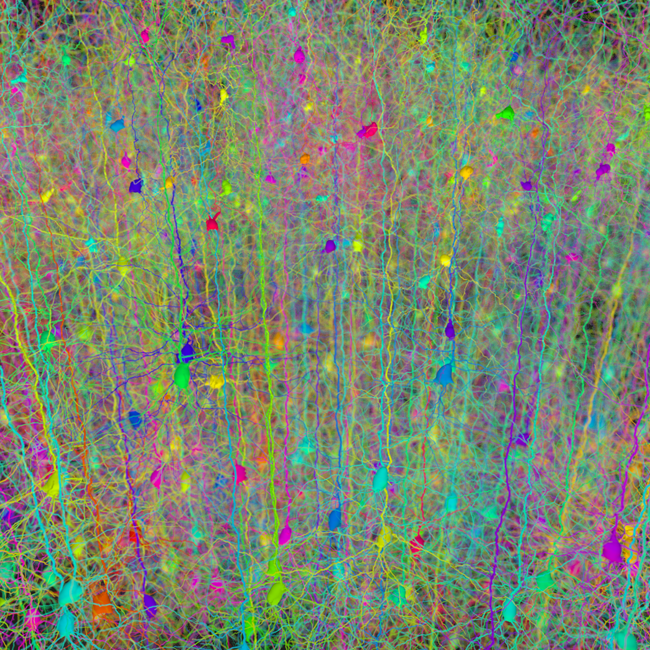
A forest of synthetic pyramidal dendrites generated in silico using Cajal's laws of neuronal branching

In biology and other experimental sciences, an in silico experiment is one performed on a computer or via computer simulation software. The phrase is pseudo-Latin for 'in silicon' (correct Latin: in silicio), referring to silicon in computer chips. It was coined in 1987 as an allusion to the Latin phrases in vivo, in vitro, and in situ, which are commonly used in biology (especially systems biology). The latter phrases refer, respectively, to experiments done in living organisms, outside living organisms, and where they are found in nature.

== History ==
The earliest known use of the phrase was by Christopher Langton to describe artificial life, in the announcement of a workshop on that subject at the Center for Nonlinear Studies at the Los Alamos National Laboratory in 1987. The expression in silico was first used to characterize biological experiments carried out entirely in a computer in 1989, in the workshop "Cellular Automata: Theory and Applications" in Los Alamos, New Mexico, by Pedro Miramontes, a mathematician from National Autonomous University of Mexico (UNAM), presenting the report "DNA and RNA Physicochemical Constraints, Cellular Automata and Molecular Evolution". The work was later presented by Miramontes as his dissertation.

In silico has been used in white papers written to support the creation of bacterial genome programs by the Commission of the European Community. The first referenced paper where in silico appears was written by a French team in 1991. The first referenced book chapter where in silico appears was written by Hans B. Sieburg in 1990 and presented during a Summer School on Complex Systems at the Santa Fe Institute.

The phrase in silico originally applied only to computer simulations that modeled natural or laboratory processes (in all the natural sciences), and did not refer to calculations done by computer generically.

== Drug discovery with virtual screening ==
In silico study in medicine is thought to have the potential to speed the rate of discovery while reducing the need for expensive lab work and clinical trials. One way to achieve this is by producing and screening drug candidates more effectively. In 2010, for example, using the protein docking algorithm EADock (see Protein-ligand docking), researchers found potential inhibitors to an enzyme associated with cancer activity in silico. Fifty percent of the molecules were later shown to be active inhibitors in vitro. This approach differs from use of expensive high-throughput screening (HTS) robotic labs to physically test thousands of diverse compounds a day, often with an expected hit rate on the order of 1% or less, with still fewer expected to be real leads following further testing (see drug discovery).

As an example, the technique was utilized for a drug repurposing study in order to search for potential cures for COVID-19 (SARS-CoV-2).

== Cell models ==
Efforts have been made to establish computer models of cellular behavior. For example, in 2007 researchers developed an in silico model of tuberculosis to aid in drug discovery, with the prime benefit of its being faster than real time simulated growth rates, allowing phenomena of interest to be observed in minutes rather than months. More work can be found that focus on modeling a particular cellular process such as the growth cycle of Caulobacter crescentus.

These efforts fall far short of an exact, fully predictive computer model of a cell's entire behavior. Limitations in the understanding of molecular dynamics and cell biology, as well as the absence of available computer processing power, force large simplifying assumptions that constrain the usefulness of present in silico cell models.

== Genetics ==
Digital genetic sequences obtained from DNA sequencing may be stored in sequence databases, be analyzed (see Sequence analysis), be digitally altered or be used as templates for creating new actual DNA using artificial gene synthesis.

== Other examples ==
In silico computer-based modeling technologies have also been applied in:

- Whole cell analysis of prokaryotic and eukaryotic hosts e.g. E. coli, B. subtilis, yeast, CHO- or human cell lines
- Discovery of potential cure for COVID-19.
- Bioprocess development and optimization e.g. optimization of product yields
- Simulation of oncological clinical trials exploiting grid computing infrastructures, such as the European Grid Infrastructure, for improving the performance and effectiveness of the simulations.
- Analysis, interpretation and visualization of heterologous data sets from various sources e.g. genome, transcriptome or proteome data
- Validation of taxonomic assignment steps in herbivore metagenomics study.
- Protein design. One example is RosettaDesign, a software package under development and free for academic use.

== See also ==
- Virtual screening
- Computational biology
- Computational biomodeling
- Computer experiment
- Folding@home
- Exscalate4Cov
- Cellular model
- Nonclinical studies
- Organ-on-a-chip
- In silico molecular design programs
- In silico medicine
- Dry lab
