= Urgent computing =

Urgent computing is prioritized and immediate access on supercomputers and grids for emergency computations such as severe weather prediction during matters of immediate concern.

Applications that provide decision makers with information during critical emergencies cannot waste time waiting in job queues and need access to computational resources as soon as possible. Systems for urgent computing commonly use dedicated resources to ensure immediate and dedicated access to urgent computations. However, recent studies have shown the possibility of using shared resources to make urgent computing more economical.
