= Eni Plenitude =

Italian energy company

Eni Plenitude S.p.A. Società Benefit
- Formerly: Eni gas e luce S.p.A. Società Benefit (2017-2022)
- Type: Private
- Industry: Energy
- Founded: July 1, 2017; 9 years ago
- Founder: Eni
- Headquarters: Via Giovanni Lorenzini 4, Milan, Italy
- Area served: Italy
- Products: Electrical energy Gas; Commodity
- Revenue: ▼€10,168 million (2025)
- Net income: ▼€254 million (2025)
- Number of employees: ▲2890 (2025)
- Website: corporate.eniplenitude.com

Eni Plenitude S.p.A. Società Benefit (formerly: Eni gas e luce S.p.A. Società Benefit) is an Italian company controlled by Eni S.p.A. active in the sale and marketing of gas and electricity for households and businesses, the production of renewable energy and the management of charging points for electric vehicles.

Eni gas e luce was created on 1 July 2017 following the transformation of the previous Gas&Power division into a new retail company for gas and electricity under the management and control of Eni. Stefano Goberti has been the CEO of the company since 5 November 2021.

The company is part of the Eni group, which was founded by Enrico Mattei in 1953 with the name Ente Nazionale Idrocarburi and which in the nineties, when the public monopoly on the energy market ceased, became a joint-stock company. Today Eni operates not only in the protected market, but also in the Free Energy Market in Italy. In July 2021, Eni gas e luce updated its corporate bylaws in Benefit Company, becoming the first major company in the energy sector in Italy to adopt this term.

On 22 November 2021, Eni presented, during the Capital Markets Day event on the Milan Stock Exchange, a new company that combines production from renewables, the sale of energy and energy services and a network of charging points for electric vehicles: in March 2022, Eni gas e luce changed its name to Eni Plenitude.

In March 2024, Energy Infrastructure Partners (EIP) acquired a stake in Eni Plenitude of approximately 7.6%, a share that increased to 10% of the capital in March 2025.

== Activity ==
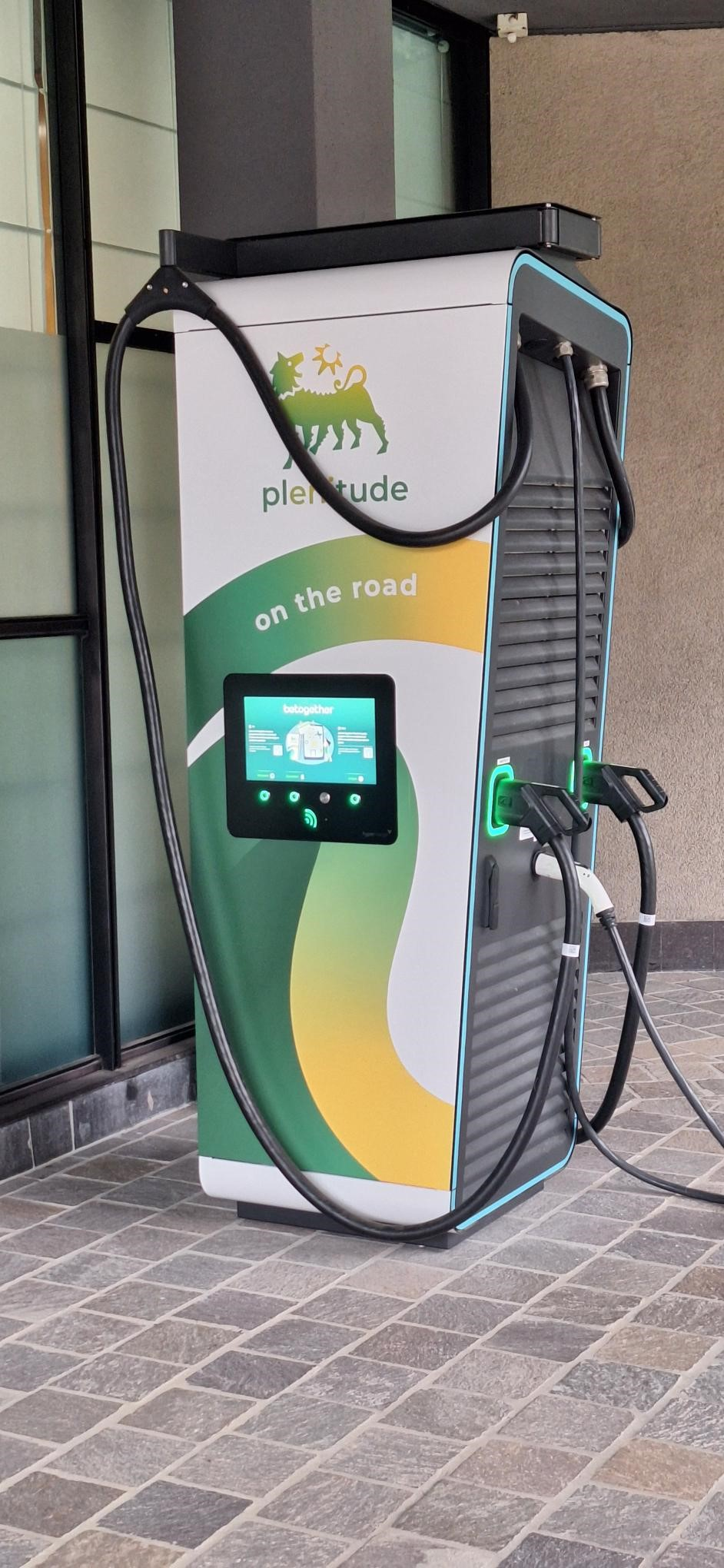
Eni Plenitude charging station

In 2019 Eni gas e luce acquired the majority stake in the company SEA S.p.A. opening up to the energy requalification sector of buildings, especially for industrial buildings and condominiums. In August Eni gas e luce became the first company among energy companies to be registered in the Registro Unico degli Intermediari Assicurativi, as an insurance intermediary, receiving the mandate from the Zurich company. In the same year, in October, it launched the new E-Start service, proposing charging solutions for electric vehicles and entering the sustainable mobility market.

In January 2020, it acquired 70% of the Evolvere company, which operates in the sales, installation and maintenance of photovoltaic systems. In the August of the following year, the company acquires 100% of the second largest charging network for electric vehicles in Italy, Be Charge S.r.l.

In September 2022 the newly renamed company Eni Plenitude acquired a 65% stake in Hergo Renewables S.P.A., a company that holds a portfolio of projects in Italy and Spain with a total capacity of approximately 1.5GW.

As of 31 December 2025, Eni Plenitude has 5.8 GW of installed capacity from renewable sources.

In December 2025 Plenitude signed an agreement with ACEA S.p.A. to acquire 100% of ACEA Energia and a 50% stake in Umbria Energy.The acquisition was completed in April 2026.

=== Installed capacity from renewable sources ===
Below is a table showing the installed capacity from renewable sources:

Annual installed capacity
Year	Capacity (GW)
2025	5,8
2024	4,1
2023	3
2022	2,2
2021	1,1
2020	0,3

=== Electric mobility services ===
Be Charge

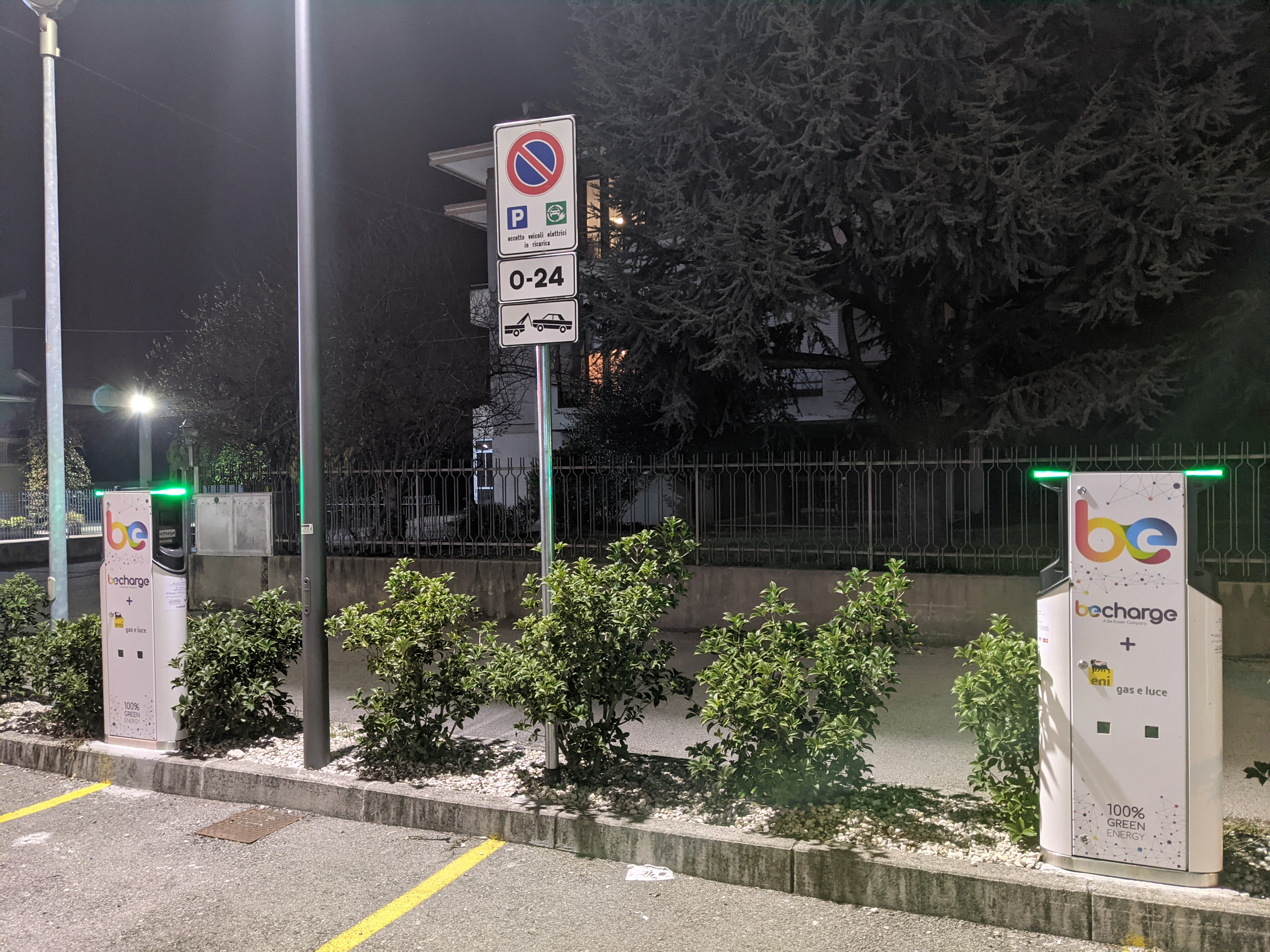
Be Charge charging station

Be Charge S.r.l. is an Italian company that provides a charging network for electric vehicles in Italy.

Founded in 2017 by Building Energy (then Be Power), in 2021 it started a partnership with Eni gas e luce, which acquired it later that year.

As of December 31, 2025, it has 22,758 electric vehicle charging points.

Starting October 15, 2024, Plenitude launched On the Road, which unifies all home and on-road charging solutions under a single brand, also integrating the Be Charge brand within the company.

== Presence ==
Through renewable energy production projects, Eni Plenitude is present in Italy, France, Spain, Germany, Greece, Norway, the United Kingdom, the United States, Colombia, Kazakhstan, and Australia.

Eni Plenitude also operates in the retail sector, selling energy and energy solutions to a total of 10 million customers in Italy, France, Portugal, Greece, Spain, and Slovenia.

Eni Plenitude offers e-mobility services in Italy, Austria, France, Germany, Spain, Slovenia, Romania, and Switzerland.
