= Eni =

Italian multinational energy company

Eni S.p.A.

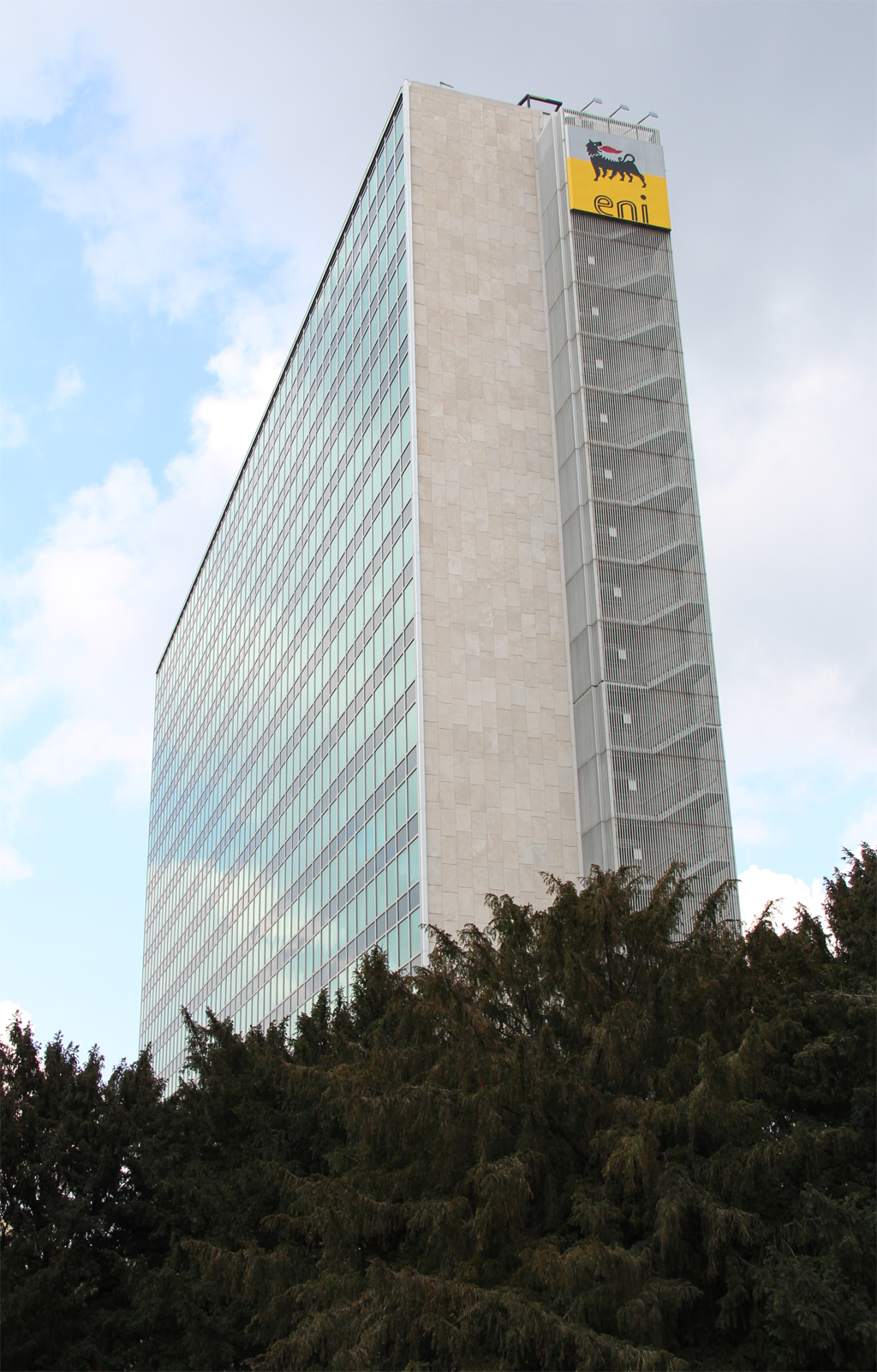
- Palazzo Eni, the group's headquarters
- Type: Public
- Traded as: BIT: ENI; NYSE: E; FTSE MIB component (ENI); EURO STOXX 50 component
- ISIN: IT0003132476
- Industry: Oil and gas
- Founded: 10 February 1953; 73 years ago
- Founder: Government of Italy; Enrico Mattei, first CEO
- Headquarters: Palazzo ENI, EUR, Rome, Italy
- Area served: Worldwide
- Key people: Giuseppina Di Foggia (Chairwoman); Claudio Descalzi (CEO)
- Products: Petroleum, natural gas, petroleum products
- Revenue: ▼€82.20 billion (2025)
- Operating income: ▼€5.010 billion (2025)
- Net income: ▼€2.61 billion (2025)
- Total assets: ▼€137.1 billion (2025)
- Total equity: ▼€52.8 billion (2025)
- Owner: Ministry of Economy and Finance (2.166%); Cassa Depositi e Prestiti (30.918%)
- Number of employees: 32,349 (2025)
- Subsidiaries: Enilive; Eni Plenitude; Versalis; Eni Rewind; EniPower; EniProgetti; Saipem; Agenzia Giornalistica Italia
- Website: www.eni.com/en-IT/home.html

Eni S.p.A. (Italian pronunciation: [ˈɛːni]; former acronym of Ente nazionale idrocarburi "National Hydrocarbons Board") is an Italian multinational energy company. It is considered one of the "supermajor" oil companies in the world, with a market capitalization of €48 billion, as of 31 December 2025. The Italian government owns a 33.084% golden share in the company, 2.166% held through the Ministry of Economy and Finance and 30.918% through the Cassa Depositi e Prestiti. The company is a component of the Euro Stoxx 50 stock market index.

Through the years after its foundation, it operated in many fields including contracting, nuclear power, energy, mining, chemicals and plastics, refining/extraction and distribution machinery, the hospitality industry and even the textile industry and news.

With revenues of around €92.2 billion, Eni ranked 111th on both the Fortune Global 500 and the Forbes Global 2000 in 2022, making it the third-largest Italian company on the Fortune list (after Assicurazioni Generali and Enel) and second largest on the Forbes list (after Enel). On the Fortune Global 500, Eni is the largest petroleum company in Italy, the second largest based in the European Union (after TotalEnergies), and the 13th largest in the world. In 2024, the company's seat in the Forbes Global 2000 was 151, while in the Fortune Global 500 it was 98.

== History ==
=== 1950s–1960s ===
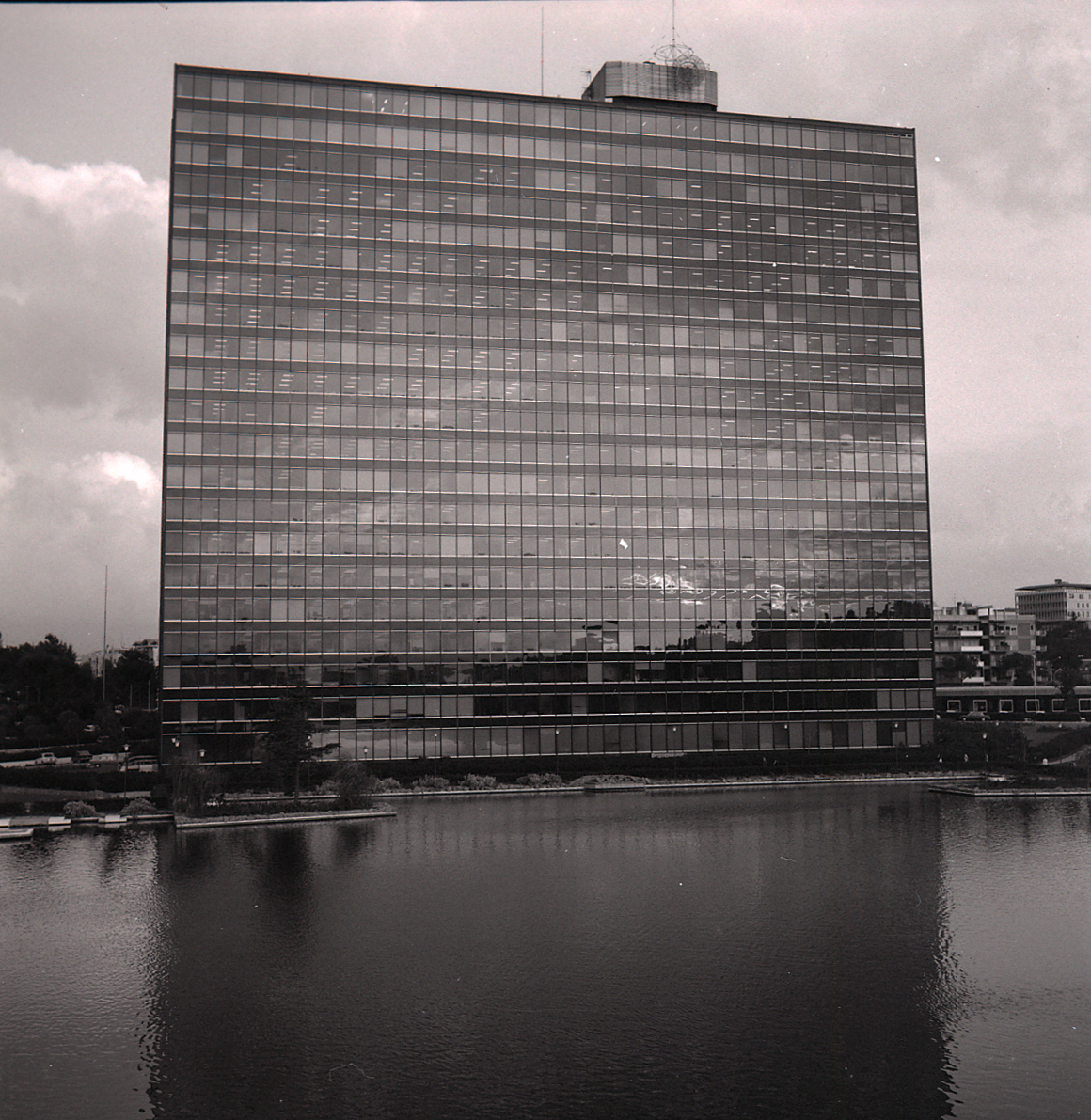
Palazzo ENI, Rome, built 1959–1962. Photo by Paolo Monti, 1967

Eni was founded in 1953 by an existing company, Agip, which was created in 1926 with the aim to explore for oilfields, and acquire and commercialize oil and derivatives. In March 1953, Enrico Mattei was nominated Eni's chairman. In 1952, the logo of the then nascent Eni was selected. The logo is a six-legged dog, an imaginary animal symbolizing the sum of a car's four wheels and the two legs of its driver.

Starting in 1954, Eni acquired extensive exploration rights in North Africa, signing an agreement with the Egyptian government led by Nasser while providing an active and equal role for the crude producing countries through the establishment of joint ventures. In 1957, Eni pushed for a similar agreement, known as the "Mattei formula", to be signed with Persian Shah Mohammad Reza Pahlavi and the National Iranian Oil Company. In 1960, during the Cold War period, Eni signed an agreement with the Soviet Union for the importation of Russian crude at low prices.

On 27 October 1962, Enrico Mattei's airplane mysteriously exploded near Bascapè, on his way to Milan from Catania. His death was initially considered an accident, but later it was confirmed to be a murder with the aim of protecting and hiding important economic and political interests in Italy and especially abroad, as it is clearly stated in the records of the trial on the assassination of the journalist Mauro De Mauro, who was investigating the death of Enrico Mattei.

During the following years, Eni signed joint venture contracts with foreign companies to supply crude from Egypt to Iran and from Libya to Tunisia. In 1963, Eni acquired a majority stake in Italgas.

=== 1970s–1980s ===
In October 1973, after the Yom Kippur War and the OPEC embargo against the United States and the Netherlands by OPEC members and Arab countries, a serious oil crisis occurred, causing Eni to consolidate its position in the international market by signing an agreement with Sonatrach, the Algerian state oil entity for natural gas supply.

In 1974, Eni signed an agreement with the Libyan government, followed by additional agreements with Egypt, Nigeria and Tunisia.

During the mid-1970s, Eni planned a major infrastructure for transporting natural gas over long distances, by building a pipeline network of thousands of miles throughout Europe and the Mediterranean.

After the inauguration of the Trans-Mediterranean Pipeline connecting Algeria to Sicily through Tunisia, Eni signed a new agreement with Libya for the exploitation of Boùri, the biggest oilfield in the centre of the Mediterranean, and developed its international role within the oil industry.

=== 1990s ===
In 1992, Eni became a joint-stock company by Law Decree, and was listed to the Italian and New York Stock Exchange in 1995.

From 1995 to 1998, Eni successfully made four share offers, as 70% of its capital assets were sold to private shareholders.

As the price of oil collapsed in 1998, like other major companies, Eni got into the melee of mergers, international acquisitions, new exploration and the foundation of real super-companies.

=== 2000s ===
Since 2000, Eni has been developing the Kashagan oilfield a major offshore discovery, along the Caspian Sea.

In 2005, the Blue Stream pipeline, projected to supply gas from southern Russia to Turkey, was inaugurated as a joint venture between Eni and Gazprom.

In 2007, Eni signed an agreement to conduct South Stream a feasibility study with Gazprom to import Russian gas into Europe across the Black Sea.

Activist asset manager Knight Vinke, who owns 1% of the outstanding shares of the company, began pressuring Eni's management to operate a spin-off of Eni's gas activities. In its opinion, this would solve the undervaluation of the company and release up to 50 billion euros ($70bn) of hidden value.

=== 2010s ===
In 2010, Eni achieved a key production milestone in Iraqi Zubair oil field. After getting a licence in 2006 for the exploration of an offshore area in the north of Mozambique, known as Area 4, Eni announced several major natural gas discoveries between 2011 and 2012 such as Mamba South, Mamba North, Mamba North East and Coral 1.

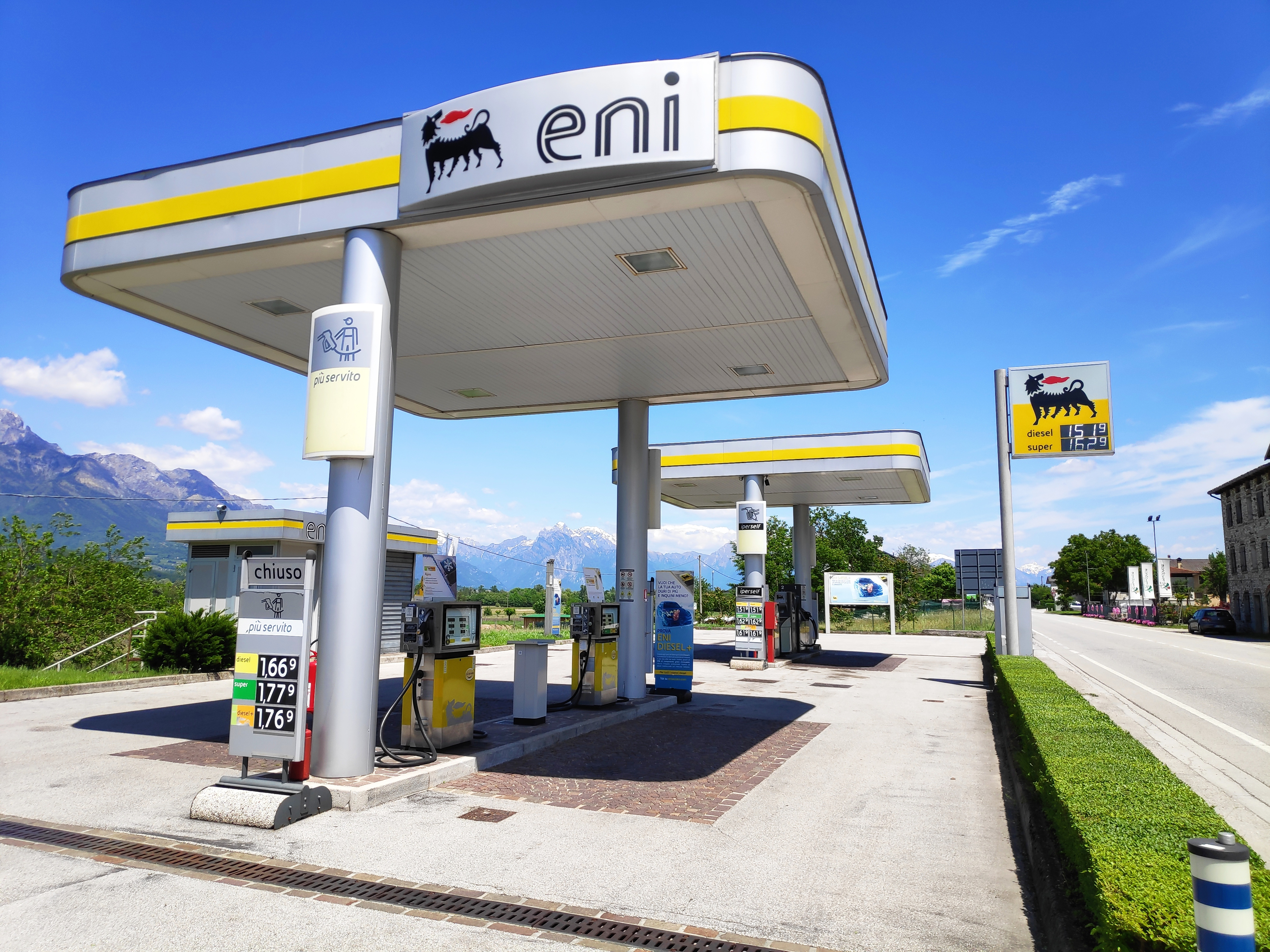
Eni petrol station in Lentiai

In February 2014, Eni discovered oil at its Democratic Republic of the Congo offshore block. Since 2012, Eni has been selling off refining and marketing assets it owned in eastern Europe to increase profitability. By 2013 Eni had already reduced its refining capacity by 13 percent. In May 2014 Eni agreed to sell their 32.5% share in Česká rafinerská a.s. (CRC), a refining company in the Czech Republic, to MOL Group of Hungary.

In June 2014, the company signed an agreement with Sasol to acquire a 40% interest in a permit to explore 82,000-km^{2} offshore of South Africa's east coast. In 2014, Eni launched a new plan to convert its conventional refineries into biorefineries: the first plant was in Porto Marghera, in 2019 the second one opened in Gela. In January 2015, Eni in collaboration with Vitol Energy signed a $7 billion contract with the government of Ghana. This agreement was reached to produce oil and gas at Cape Three Points in the Western Region of Ghana, in an attempt to enable Ghana to meet its power and energy needs. In August 2015, Eni announced the discovery of a huge gasfield off the coast of Egypt. In 2016, Eni launched Progetto Italia, which aims to redevelop its industrial areas and to create new renewable sources production plants: in 2018 the first photovoltaic plant was inaugurated in Assemini, the second opened in Porto Torres, both in Sardinia. In July 2017, the oil giant accepted responsibility for an oil spill affecting the Fylde coast of Blackpool in the United Kingdom.

In January 2018, Eni launched its new HPC4 supercomputer, one of the most powerful computing systems which allows a more effective and fast exploration of oil and gas reservoirs. Since February 2020 Eni replaced the HPC4 supercomputer with the new model HPC5, which has three times the computing ability compared to the previous one and debuted in sixth position as the most powerful supercomputer of the world. In November 2024, Eni launched its new HPC6 supercomputer, the most powerful in Europe and the fifth in the world, capable of executing over 600 million billion complex mathematical operations in just one second.

In March 2018, Eni reached an agreement with MIT to fund fusion research projects run out of the MIT Plasma Science and Fusion Center (PSFC)’s newly created Laboratory for Innovation in Fusion Technologies (LIFT). The expected investment in these research projects will amount to about $2 million over the following years. The Rovuma LNG project was approved in May 2019 by the government of Mozambique. The project is a joint venture between ExxonMobil, Eni and CNPC. Eni will focus on the construction and operation of the upstream facilities.

=== 2020s ===
In March 2021, Eni exited the Pakistani market and sold its assets to Prime International Oil & Gas Company. The deal include the assets sold, interests in eight development and production leases and four exploration licences. Prime International Oil & Gas Company, a newly established joint venture (JV) between Eni Pakistan local employees and Hub Power Company.

In 2018, Eni became the first shareholder of the American company Commonwealth Fusion Systems (CFS), a spin-out of the Massachusetts Institute of Technology (MIT) in Boston. CFS aims to build a fusion reactor based on tokamak technology, much more compact and cheaper compared to other existing projects such as the international ITER. On 5 September 2021, CFS successfully built and tested a 1:1 scale prototype of a magnet based on HTS (High Temperature Superconductors) superconductors. The experiment demonstrated for the first time that it is possible to create a fusion chamber where the confinement of the plasma is ensured by this type of super magnets. This kind of fusion chamber will allow the reactor to reach very high temperatures, above 100 million degrees, necessary to make the controlled fusion of deuterium and tritium possible and thus to produce sustainable energy. In December 2021, ENI become the first energy company in the world to highly invest in magnetic confinement nuclear fusion, through a $1.8 billion partnership in CFS, along with Google and Bill Gates.

In 2022, during the Russian invasion of Ukraine, the major oil and gas companies, including Eni, reported sharp rises in interim revenues and profits. The rises are influenced by the prices of raw materials such as oil and gas which have significantly increased, due to their shortage. On 17 May 2022, Eni announced the procedures for the creation of an account with Gazprombank in dual currency (euro and rubles), in order to be able to proceed with the payment of Russian gas supplies, following the unilateral amendment of the contracts ordered by the Russian Federation. The decision was taken in agreement with the Italian government and does not violate the existing sanctions. The European Commissioner for Economy Paolo Gentiloni and the competent Russian federal authorities have confirmed that payments will continue to be made in euros and that the conversion operations will be carried out by Russian clearing agents without the involvement of the Russian Central Bank. In June 2022, Eni signed a joint venture with QatarEnergy for the North Field East (NFE) expansion which will be the worlds largest LNG project and begin production in 2025. Eni holds a 3.125% stake in the four LNG trains estimated to produce 8 million tonnes a year each.

In October 2023, QatarEnergy signed LNG supply deal with Italy's Eni for 27 years. Affiliates of QatarEnergy and Eni signed a long-term sale and purchase agreement for up to 1 million tons per year (mtpa) of liquefied natural gas (LNG) from Qatar's North Field expansion project. After 10 years of force majeure, Eni, Sonatrach and BP resumed exploration in their blocks in the Ghadames Basin (A-B) and offshore Block C in August 2023, continuing their contract obligations.

In January 2024, Eni acquired Neptune Energy for $4.9 billion. The list of assets includes Neptune’s involvement in the Geng North-1 gas field in Indonesia, as well as projects in Western Europe, Australia and North Africa. Neptune’s business in Norway was purchased directly by Vår Energi, a subsidiary of Eni. The assets in Germany were released before the transaction, and will remain with Neptune, managed by the shareholders as a separate group. In March 2024, Eni made discoveries off the Ivory Coast. In July 2024, new oil and gas was discovered in Block 9 of the Yopaat-1 EXP exploration well located off the shore of Mexico in the Sureste Basin. In July 2024, Vår Energi extended its supply deal with Eni until 2036 for up to 5bcm of natural gas.

On 13 February 2025, Eni announced its Formula One return by supplying fuels to Renault-powered BWT Alpine F1 Team from 2025 season onwards. In April 2025, Eni announced that it would buyback $1.7 billion in shares over the course of the year even as the outlook on oil continues to worsen. Eni had an adjusted net profit in the first three months of 2025 of just 1.41 billion euros, which was an 11% decrease from the previous year which caused the company to revise its spending plan. Increases in underlying hydrocarbon production is expected to grow by 4% per year until 2028.

In July 2026, Eni agreed with Swiss commodities trader Mercuria to establish a 50:50 joint venture combining parts of their global energy trading operations. Headquartered in Geneva, the venture is intended to cover crude oil, refined petroleum products, natural gas, liquefied natural gas (LNG), liquefied petroleum gas (LPG), biofuels and associated logistics activities. The partnership aims to combine Eni's physical energy portfolio with Mercuria's international trading and risk-management capabilities.

== Financial data ==
Financial data in € billions
Year	2013	2014	2015	2016	2017	2018	2019	2020	2021	2022	2023	2024	2025
Revenue	116.107	110.948	68.945	56.693	66.919	75.822	69.881	43.987	76.575	132.512	93.72	88.80	82.20
Net Income	4.972	0.850	−7.127	−1.044	3.374	4.126	0.148	−8.635	5.821	13.887	4.771	2.62	2.61
Assets	138.088	146.207	134.792	124.545	114.928	118.373	123.440	109.648	137.765	152.130	142.606	146.939	137.1
Employees	30,970	29,403	29,053	33,536	32,934	31,701	32,053	31,495	32,689	32,188	33,142	32,492	32,349

== Operations ==
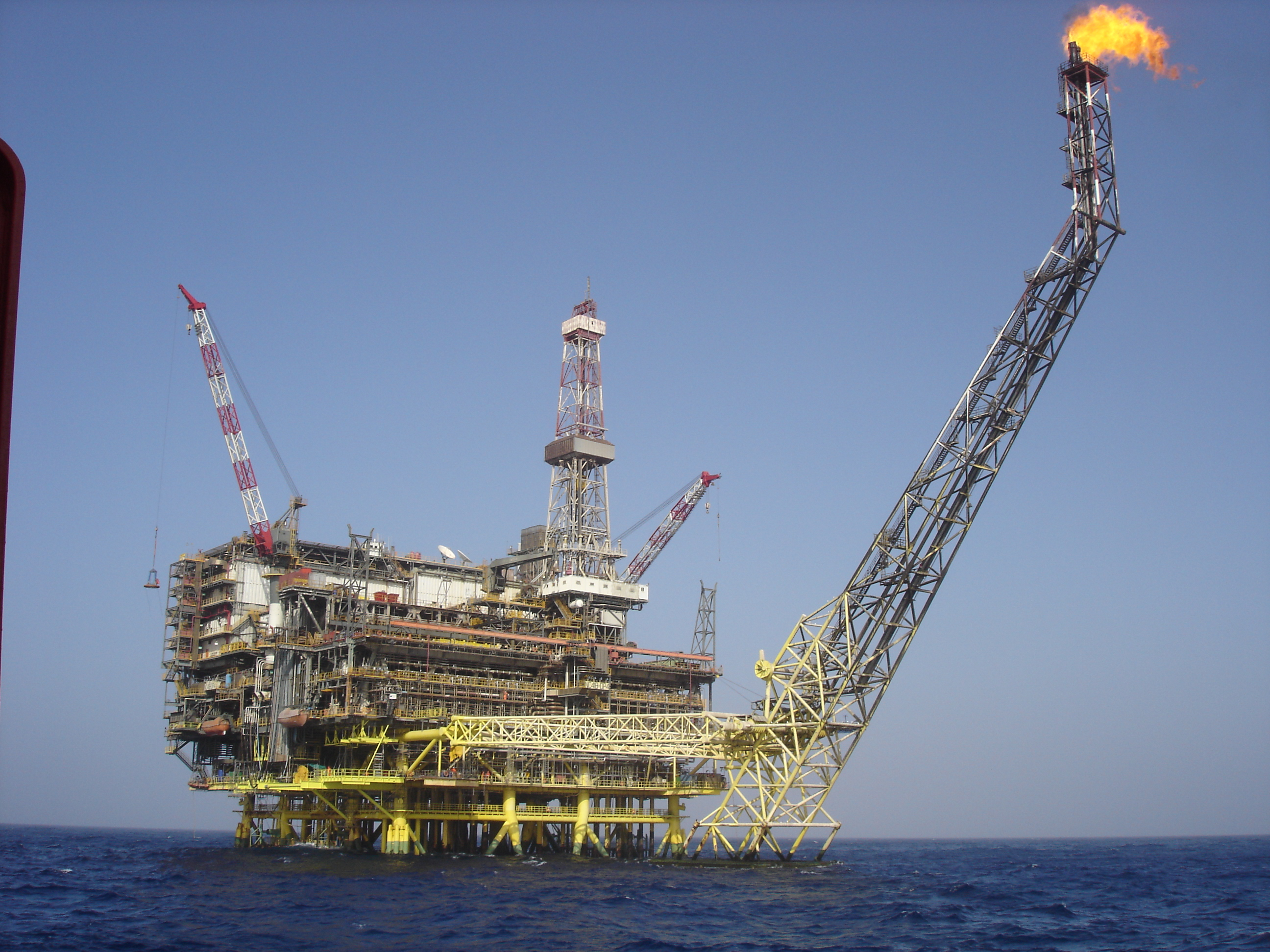
Eni Oil Bouri DP4 in Bouri Field is the biggest platform in the Mediterranean Sea.

=== Exploration and production ===
As exploration and reserve replacement being major drivers for the company, Eni boosts for production additions in its core oil field areas (North and Sub-Saharan Africa, Venezuela, Barents Sea, Yamal Peninsula, Kazakhstan, Iraq and the Far East). Eni has about 130 exploration and production subsidiaries, such as Eni Norge. In March 2022 Eni stopped buying Russian oil because of International sanctions during the Russo-Ukrainian War.

In 2012, Eni reported liquids and gas production for the full year of 1,701 thousand barrel of oil equivalent per day (kboe/d), this being calculated assuming a natural gas conversion factor to barrel equivalent, updated to 5,492 cubic feet of gas equal 1 barrel of oil from 1 July 2012.

During 2012, 60 new exploratory wells were drilled, as 56 were drilled in 2011 and 47 in 2010. The overall commercial success rate was 40% (40.8% net to Eni) as compared to 42% in 2011 (38.6% net to Eni) and 41% in 2010 (39% net to Eni). In 2012, 351 development wells were drilled as well, as 407 in 2011 and 399 in 2010.

In 2019 Eni reported hydrocarbon production for the full year of 1,871 kboe/d.

In 2021 Eni reported hydrocarbon production for the full year of 1,682 kboe/d.

In 2022 Eni reported hydrocarbon production for the full year of 1,610 kboe/d.

In 2023 Eni reported hydrocarbon production for the full year of 1,66 kboe/d.

In 2024 Eni reported hydrocarbon production for the full year of 1,70 kboe/d.

In 2025 Eni reported hydrocarbon production for the full year of 1,73 kboe/d.

=== Gas and power ===
==== Natural gas ====
In 2012, sales of natural gas were 95.32 bcm, down 1.44 bcm compared to 2011.

In 2019 Eni reported sales of natural gas worldwide of 73.07 bcm.

In 2021 Eni reported sales of natural gas worldwide of 70.45 bcm.

In 2022 Eni reported sales of natural gas worldwide of 60.52 bcm.

In 2023 Eni reported sales of natural gas worldwide of 50.51 bcm.

In 2024 Eni reported sales of natural gas worldwide of 50.88 bcm.

In 2025 Eni reported sales of natural gas worldwide of 43.72 bcm.

Eni's power generation sites are located in Ferrera Erbognone, Ravenna, Livorno, Taranto, Mantua, Brindisi, Ferrara and Bolgiano. In 2012, Eni's power generation was 25.67 TWh. Overall Eni supplies 2,600 customers including large companies, power generation companies, wholesalers and distributors of natural gas for automotive use. Residential users are 7.45 million and include households, professionals, small and medium size enterprises, and public bodies located all over Italy and 2.09 million customers in European Countries. International sales include Iberian Peninsula, Germany, Austria, Benelux, Hungary, UK/Northern Europe, Turkey, France markets.

==== Power generation ====
Eni's electricity generation sites in Italy, as of July 2018, are the following:

Natural gas power plants

- Bolgiano – 95 MW
- Brindisi – 1715 MW
- Ferrara – 586 MW
- Ferrera Erbognone – 1785 MW
- Mantua – 1387 MW
- Ravenna – 618 MW

=== Refining and marketing ===
Eni is the leader operator in refining and marketing of petroleum products in Italy. Eni is engaged in retail and wholesales activities in Central-Eastern European countries also (Austria, France, Germany, Italy, Czech Republic, Romania, Slovakia, Slovenia, Switzerland, Hungary). Eni's market share in refining and marketing in 2019 was 23.7% in Italy, 12.3% in Austria, 7.7% in Switzerland, 3.2% in Germany and 0.6% in France. Eni also owned a 20% share of Ruwais refinery in Abu Dhabi. Retail sales operations are conducted under the Eni and Agip brands. The re-branding of Eni's service stations in Italy and in the rest of Europe to Eni brand is underway.

=== Engineering and construction ===
Eni operates in engineering, construction and drilling both offshore and onshore for the oil & gas industry through the subsidiary Saipem.

In April 2012, Eni in collaboration with ZEiTECS announced the world's first offshore rigless/wireline retrievable ESP system for Eni Congo.

== Subsidiaries ==
Eni's principal subsidiaries include:

- Azule Energy is an incorporated joint venture (IJV) between BP p.l.c. and Eni SpA. – combines the Angolan upstream, LNG and solar businesses of BP p.l.c. and Eni SpA)
- Enibioch4in – biomethane production
- Eni India – is expected to start drilling at a deepwater block 2, near Andaman and Nicobar Islands in Q2 of 2011 as it has received 2-year extension for the completion of drilling program. The program was delayed due to various environmental issues and scarcity of oil rigs. ENI India had won this block in 2005 and partners with ONGC and GAIL India.
- Eni Industrial Evolution – management and transformation of Eni's traditional downstream assets in Europe and the Middle East
- Eni Next LLC – Corporate Venture Capital of Eni Group
- Eni Plenitude – marketing of natural gas and power to households and businesses, energy production from renewable sources, and charging stations for electric vehicles
- EniPower – generation and sale of electricity and steam technology
- EniProgetti – engineering services
- Eni Rewind – integrated service for environmental rehabilitation
- Enilive SpA (formerly Eni Sustainable Mobility SpA) – company dedicated to sustainable mobility and the supply of decarbonised services and products
- Eni UK – carries out operations in the British section of the North Sea, in the Irish Sea and off the coast of the Shetland Islands. Has been present in UK since 1964. In 2006 Eni UK's average net production of hydrocarbons was more than 141,000 boe/d.
- Eniverse – Corporate Venture Builder company for technological innovation
- Export LNG Ltd – owns the Tango FLNG floating liquefaction plant in the Republic of Congo
- Ieoc SpA – active subsidiary in Egypt
- LNG Shipping SpA – sea transport of liquefied natural gas
- Saipem (21.19% owned) – Saipem is an oil and gas industry contractor. Saipem has contracted for engineering, oilfield services and construction both offshore and onshore through several pipelines, including Blue Stream, Greenstream, Nord Stream 1 and South Stream. It is a subsidiary listed on the Italian Stock Exchange
- Versalis (100% owned) – Versalis is a chemical company that manages the production and marketing of petrochemical products such as olefines, aromatics and intermediates (base chemicals), styrenes, elastomers and polyethylene, plus in recent years a focus on green chemistry, being also able to count on a range of proprietary technologies, advanced plant facilities and a broad-based distribution network.

== Legal problems ==
The Central Energy Italian Gas Holding scandal in 2005 involved Eni and Gazprom.

In 2009, the European Commission filed formal antitrust charges against Eni. The commission believes Eni has conspired to keep competitors from using its gas pipelines.

In 2009 again, according to leaked diplomatic cables, US ambassador Lanier told Washington that bribery allegations were made in Uganda by Eni which at the time was in competition for oil assets in the country against Tullow Oil. The bribes were taken by the newly appointed Ugandan prime minister, Amama Mbabazi.

After corruption charges against the subsidiary Saipem, Eni's CFO Alessandro Bernini resigned and the new CFO Massimo Mondazzi took over in December 2012.

Eni and Royal Dutch Shell stood trial in Italy over allegations of corruption in the 2011 purchase of a big offshore oil field in Nigeria known as OPL 245. Eni and Shell reportedly paid $1.3 billion in bribes. On 17 March 2021, the Italian court of Milan fully acquitted Eni, its chief executive officer Claudio Descalzi and Royal Dutch Shell in the corruption trial for the Nigerian oil field OPL245. The Nigerian government stated that it is "disappointed" by the Milan court's ruling and "will continue to hold those responsible for the OPL 245 fraud accountable." On 19 July 2022, the Attorney General waived the appeal before the Second Section of the Court of Appeal of Milan, making the acquittal sentences pronounced in March 2021 final. On 8 October 2024, the deputy prosecutor Fabio De Pasquale and the public prosecutor Sergio Spadaro were sentenced by the Court of Brescia to 8 months in prison for the omission of evidence deemed favorable to the defendants, in the Eni - Nigeria trial. On 18 June 2026, the Court of Cassation annulled the conviction without referral and acquitted De Pasquale and Spadaro, ruling that "the offence does not exist".

== Sustainability ==
In 2012, Eni was included in the Carbon Performance Leadership Index, which scores companies based on their commitment to transparency and environmental leadership. In the first half of 2014 Eni achieved the start-up of the Porto Torres green chemistry plant and the Venice biorefinery, with the aim to increase its production of bio and green energy. According to the 2017 Carbon Majors Report, which stores GHG emissions data on the largest company-related sources of all time, Eni accounted for 0.59% of global industrial greenhouse gas emissions from 1988 to 2015. In 2019, Eni was among the Top 10 companies by sustainability score in the World Business Council for Sustainable Development (WBCSD) rank. From 2020 to 2022, Eni is the first oil company with the most ambitious absolute emissions reduction target according to the report Absolute Impact 2022 by Carbon Tracker Initiative in accordance with the goals of the Paris Agreement to significantly lower GHG emissions and increase the production of renewable energy. In September 2021, Eni joined together with the International Renewable Energy Agency (IRENA) in a three-year partnership to promote renewable energy.

== Corporate structure ==
=== Board of directors ===
The board of directors is comprised as follows as of May 2026:

- Giuseppina Di Foggia, Chairman
- Claudio Descalzi, CEO
- Stefano Cappiello, Director
- Carolyn Adele Dittmeier, Director
- Benedetta Fiorini, Director
- Emma Marcegaglia, Director
- Matteo Petrella, Director
- Cristina Sgubin, Director
- Raphael Louis L. Vermeir, Director

== See also ==
- List of petroleum companies
