= In silico medicine =

In silico medicine (also known as "computational medicine") is the application of in silico research to problems involving health and medicine. It is the direct use of computer simulation in the diagnosis, treatment, or prevention of a disease. More specifically, in silico medicine is characterized by modeling, simulation, and visualization of biological and medical processes in computers with the goal of simulating real biological processes in a virtual environment.

== History ==
The term in silico was first used in 1989 at a workshop "Cellular Automata: Theory and Applications" by a mathematician from National Autonomous University of Mexico (UNAM). The term in silico radiation oncology, a precursor of generic in silico medicine was coined and first introduced by G. Stamatakos in Proceedings of the IEEE in 2002. The same researcher coined and introduced the more generic term in silico oncology. In silico medicine is considered an extension of previous work using mathematical models of biological systems. It became apparent that the techniques used to model biological systems has utility to explain and predict dynamics in the medical field. The first fields in medicine to use in silico modeling were genetics, physiology and biochemistry. The field saw a dramatic influx of data when the human genome was sequenced in the 1980s and 1990s. Concurrently the increase in available computational power allowed for modeling of complex systems that were previously impractical.

== Rationale ==
There are numerous reasons why in silico medicine is used. For example, in silico medical modeling can allow for early prediction of success of a compound for a medicinal purpose and elucidate potential adverse effects early in the drug discovery process. In silico modeling can also provide a humane alternative to animal testing. It has been purported by a company in the field, that computer-aided models will make the use of testing on living organisms obsolete.

== Examples ==
The term in silico medicine is exemplified in initiatives such as the Virtual Physiological Human by the European Commission and in institutes such as the VPH Institute and the INSIGNEO Institute at the University of Sheffield.

The In Silico Oncology Group (ISOG) at the Institute of Communication and Computer Systems, National Technical Institute of Athens (ICCS-NTUA) aims at developing clinically driven and oriented multiscale simulation models of malignant tumors (cancer) to be utilized as patient individualized decision support and treatment planning systems following completion of clinical adaptation and validation. An additional aim of the Group's research is to simulate oncological clinical trials which would otherwise be too costly or time intensive and to this direction, grid computing infrastructures have been exploited, such as the European Grid Infrastructure, to increase the performance and effectiveness of the simulations. ISOG has led the development of the first technologically integrated Oncosimulator, a joint Euro-Japanese research venture.

In 2003, the first vaccine based solely off of genomic information was developed. The technique of developing the vaccine, termed "reverse vaccinology", used the genomic information and not the infectious bacteria itself to develop the vaccine.

In December 2018, the four-year PRIMAGE project was launched. This EU-funded Horizon 2020 project proposes a cloud-based platform to support decision making in the clinical management of malignant solid tumours, offering predictive tools to assist diagnosis, prognosis, therapies choice and treatment follow up, based on the use of novel imaging biomarkers, in-silico tumour growth simulation, advanced visualization of predictions with weighted confidence scores and machine-learning based translation of this knowledge into predictors for the most relevant, disease-specific, Clinical End Points.

In 2020, the first CADFEM Medical Conference on the topic of in vivo, in vitro, in silico was held with the guiding theme: "The central role of in silico medicine – what it can do and what we need for its practice."

== Research ==
As modeling of human, social, behavioral, and cultural (HSBC) characteristics of patient behavior becomes more sophisticated, there is speculation that virtual patients may replace patient actors in medical school curriculum. Additionally, there are projects underway that utilize virtual cadavers, computer simulated models of human anatomy based on CT images of real people.

== See also ==
- In silico clinical trials
- Computational biology
