= Cenegermin =

Pharmaceutical drug

Clinical data
- Trade names: Oxervate
- Other names: Recombinant human nerve growth factor; rhNGF, cenegermin-bkbj
- AHFS/Drugs.com: Monograph
- MedlinePlus: a619001
- License data: US DailyMed: Cenegermin
- Pregnancy category: AU: B3
- Routes of administration: Ophthalmic
- ATC code: S01XA24 (WHO)

Legal status
- Legal status: AU: S4 (Prescription only); CA: ℞-only / Schedule D; US: ℞-only; EU: Rx-only

Identifiers
- CAS Number: 1772578-74-1
- DrugBank: DB13926
- ChemSpider: None
- UNII: B6E7K36KT8
- KEGG: D11028

Chemical and physical data
- Formula: C_{583}H_{908}N_{166}O_{173}S_{8}
- Molar mass: 13267.15 g·mol^{−1}

Cenegermin, sold under the brand name Oxervate, also known as recombinant human nerve growth factor, is a recombinant form of human nerve growth factor. Cenegermin is a peripherally selective agonist of the tropomyosin receptor kinase A (TrkA) and low-affinity nerve growth factor receptor (p75NTR).

The most common side effects include eye pain and inflammation, increased lacrimation (watery eyes), pain in the eyelid and sensation of a foreign body in the eye.

It was approved for medical use in the European Union in July 2017, and in the United States in 2018. The US Food and Drug Administration (FDA) considers it to be a first-in-class medication.

== Medical uses ==
Cenegermin is indicated for the treatment of neurotrophic keratitis.

== Society and culture ==
=== Names ===
Cenegermin is the international nonproprietary name. It is also known as human beta-nerve growth factor (beta-NGF)-(1–118) peptide (non-covalent dimer) produced in Escherichia coli.

Cenegermin is sold under the brand name Oxervate.
