= The MICCAI Society =

Professional organization

- The Medical Image Computing and Computer Assisted Intervention Society
- Founded: July 29, 2004; 22 years ago
- Type: Professional association
- Legal status: 501(c)(3) nonprofit organization
- Purpose: Computer Vision, Medical Imaging, Medical Devices
- Method: Industry standards, Conferences, Publications
- Key people: Marius George Linguraru (President)
- Website: www.miccai.org

The MICCAI Society is a professional organization for scientists in the areas of Medical Image Computing and Computer Assisted Interventions. Due to the multidisciplinary nature of these fields, the society brings together researchers from several scientific disciplines. including computer science, robotics, physics, and medicine. The society is best known for its annual flagship event, The MICCAI Conference, which facilitates the publication and presentation of original research on MICCAI-related topics. However, the society provides endorsements and sponsorships for several scientific events each year.

== History ==
In 1998, three international conferences: Visualization in Biomedical Computing (VBC), Computer Vision and Virtual Reality in Robotics and Medicine (CVRMed), and Medical Robotics and Computer Assisted Surgery (MRCAS) merged into a single conference entitled "The International Conference on Medical Image Computing and Computer Assisted Interventions" (abbreviated MICCAI) with its first edition in Boston. The MICCAI Society was founded in 2004 by several active members of this research community and former chairs of the MICCAI conference. In 2009, the society introduced the "MICCAI Fellow" award to recognize senior members who had made substantial contributions to the MICCAI community. 12 fellows were elected in 2009 and three additional fellows are elected each year. New MICCAI Fellows are announced each year at the Annual MICCAI Conference. Since 2012, the society is involved in several events each year outside of the annual conference through endorsements and/or sponsorships. These include a number of smaller international conferences, MICCAI-focused workshop sessions at related conferences, and educational programs such as "summer schools".

== Research focus ==
=== Medical Image Computing ===
Medical Image Computing (the "MIC" in MICCAI) is the field of study involving the application of image processing and computer vision to medical imaging. The goals of medical image computing tasks are diverse, but some common examples are computer-aided diagnosis, image segmentation of anatomical structures and/or abnormalities, and the registration or "alignment" of medical images acquired through different means or at different points in time.

=== Computer Assisted Interventions ===
Computer Assisted Interventions (the "CAI" in MICCAI) is the field of study concerned with the use of computational tools in medical interventions. Prominent examples of computer assisted interventions currently in widespread use include image guided biopsy and robot-assisted surgery. Integral to this research area is effective human-computer interaction and user interface design.

== Subgroups ==
Within the MICCAI community, a number of organizations have emerged to represent and advocate for certain populations of MICCAI researchers. Among these are the MICCAI Student Board, the Women in MICCAI and RISE-MICCAI.

=== MICCAI Student Board ===
The MICCAI Student Board began in 2010 when MICCAI initiated its social media presence by creating a facebook group. This effort was championed by student researchers who used the group to organize events specifically for students at the 2011 and 2012 annual conferences. After the 2012 event, the MICCAI board of directors formally recognized the MICCAI student board as a part of the society and began providing support for the student board's annual events.

=== Women in MICCAI ===
Women in MICCAI began as a series of networking sessions for female researchers within the medical image analysis research community during the 2015 MICCAI conference and the 2016 IEEE International Symposium on Biomedical Imaging. In October 2016, the MICCAI board of directors approved a measure to create the "Women in MICCAI Committee" with the goal of strengthening the representation of female scientists in this research area.

Since its inception, Women in MICCAI has continued to organize networking sessions in conjunction with MICCAI events. It also developed and maintains several online platforms for discussion on social media. The committee is the primary interface between the MICCAI board of directors and the community of women researchers in MICCAI.

=== RISE-MICCAI ===
RISE is the acronym for Reinforcing Inclusiveness & diverSity and Empowering MICCAI in Low-to-Middle Income Countries. RISE-MICCAI was formed to help researchers in underrepresented groups who work on the field of medical image computing and computer assisted interventions. Its goal is to strengthen the presence of minority researchers from low- to middle-income countries and build collaborative bridges across countries.

== Annual MICCAI conference ==
=== Conference format ===
MICCAI conferences are typically scheduled for five days, of which the first and last days are set aside for satellite events consisting of tutorials, workshops, and challenges. Those include the Brain lesion workshop (BrainLes), the Workshop on Interpretability of Machine Intelligence in Medical Image Computing (iMIMIC), the Workshop on Domain Adaptation and Representation Transfer (DART), the International Workshop on Multimodal Brain Image Analysis (MBIA), and others. The main conference includes invited presentations, panel discussions, and podium and poster presentations of original research papers which are published by Springer Nature as conference proceedings.

=== Past MICCAI conferences ===
| Year | Dates | Location | General Chair(s) |
|---|---|---|---|
| 2026 | September 27 - October 1, 2026 | Strasbourg | Mohammad Yaqub, Islem Rekik, and Qi Dou |
| 2025 | September 23–27, 2025 | Daejeon | Jinah Park, Polina Golland, and Jonghyo Kim |
| 2024 | October 6–10, 2024 | Marrakesh | Karim Lekadir and Julia Schnabel |
| 2023 | October 8–12, 2023 | Vancouver | Tanveer Syeda-Mahmood, James Duncan, and Russ Taylor |
| 2022 | September 18–22, 2022 | Singapore | Shuo Li |
| 2021 | September 27 - October 1, 2021 | Strasbourg | Caroline Essert |
| 2020 | October 4–8, 2020 | Lima | Daniel Racoceanu, Leo Joskowicz |
| 2019 | October 13–17, 2019 | Shenzhen | Dinggang Shen |
| 2018 | September 16–20, 2018 | Granada | Alejandro Frangi Caregnato |
| 2017 | September 10–14, 2017 | Quebec City | Simon Duchesne |
| 2016 | October 17–21, 2016 | Athens | Sebastien Ourselin, Aytül Erçil |
| 2015 | October 5–9, 2015 | Munich | Nassir Navab |
| 2014 | September 14–18, 2014 | Cambridge | Polina Golland |
| 2013 | September 22–26, 2013 | Nagoya | Kensaku Mori |
| 2012 | October 1–5, 2012 | Nice | Nicholas Ayache |
| 2011 | September 18–22, 2011 | Toronto | Gabor Fichtinger |
| 2010 | September 20–24, 2010 | Beijing | Tianzi Jiang |
| 2009 | September 20–24, 2009 | London | Guang-Zhong Yang |
| 2008 | September 6–10, 2008 | New York City | Dimitris Metaxas |
| 2007 | October 29 - November 2, 2007 | Brisbane | Anthony Maeder |
| 2006 | October 1–6, 2006 | Copenhagen | Mads Nielsen |
| 2005 | October 26–29, 2005 | Palm Springs | James Duncan |
| 2004 | September 26–29, 2004 | St. Malo | Christian Barillot |
| 2003 | November 15–18, 2003 | Montreal | Terry Peters |
| 2002 | September 25–28, 2002 | Tokyo | Takeyoshi Dohi |
| 2001 | October 14–17, 2001 | Utrecht | Max Viergever |
| 2000 | October 11–14, 2000 | Pittsburgh | Anthony M. DiGoia |
| 1999 | September 19–22, 1999 | Cambridge | Alan Colchester |
| 1998 | October 11–13, 1998 | Boston | Ron Kikinis |

=== Upcoming MICCAI conferences ===
| Year | Dates | Location | General Chair(s) |
|---|---|---|---|
| 2027 | September 26 – October 1, 2027 | Auckland | Jichao Zhao, Gabor Fichtinger, and Stamatia Giannarou |
| 2028 | October 16 – 20, 2028 | São Paulo | Natasha Leporé, Leticia Rittner, and Marius George Linguraru |

MICCAI 2026 Conference Logo

== Publications ==
The MICCAI conference proceedings consist of full-length papers which undergo comprehensive peer review. Since even before the merger of the CVRMed, MRCAS, and VBC conferences (see History), the proceedings of the annual conference have been published by Springer Nature as part of the Lecture Notes in Computer Science (LNCS) series.

In addition to the proceedings of the annual conference, MICCAI officially partners with two peer reviewed scientific journals: "Medical Image Analysis" published by Elsevier and "The International Journal of Computer Assisted Radiology and Surgery" (IJCARS) published by Springer Nature. These journals loosely correspond to the "MIC" and "CAI" focuses of the MICCAI Society respectively, but they have substantial overlap in subject matter.

The MICCAI Society also partners with Elsevier to develop a series of books on MICCAI-related research, written by scientists in the MICCAI research community. As of April 2020, 19 books have been published in this series.

== See also ==
- Robot-assisted surgery
- Computer vision
- Conference on Computer Vision and Pattern Recognition
- International Conference on Computer Vision
- European Conference on Computer Vision
- Institute of Electrical and Electronics Engineers
- International Society for Computer Aided Surgery
