= James Duncan (biomedical engineer) =

American biomedical engineer

- Born: James Scott Duncan; December 11, 1951 (age 74)
- Citizenship: American
- Education: University of Southern California (PhD); UCLA (MS); Lafayette College (BSEE)
- Scientific career
- Fields: Biomedical Image Analysis; Medical Image Computing
- Institutions: Yale University
- Thesis: A Modular Approach to Feature Extraction (1982)
- Doctoral advisor: Werner Frei; Alexander Sawchuk
- Website: medicine.yale.edu/profile/james-duncan/

James Scott Duncan (born December 11, 1951) is the Ebenezer K. Hunt Professor of Biomedical Engineering, Radiology & Biomedical Imaging, and Electrical Engineering at Yale University. Since 1983, he has specialized in biomedical image processing and analysis including machine learning methods for image interpretation, particularly for cardiac and neuroimaging. He is currently the Chair of the Department of Biomedical Engineering at Yale.

== Education ==
Duncan was educated at the University of Southern California where he was awarded a PhD degree in electrical engineering in 1982. His dissertation, titled A Modular Approach to Feature Extraction, was advised by Werner Frei and Alexander Sawchuk. He also earned an M.S. from UCLA, and he completed his undergraduate studies at Lafayette College in electrical engineering.

== Research ==
Duncan has developed new methods for image segmentation and motion analysis. Duncan has published over 300 research articles and has more than 20,000 citations.

== Awards and honors ==
Duncan's research has been supported primarily by the NIH. Duncan is a Fellow of the American Institute for Medical and Biological Engineering, the MICCAI Society and the IEEE. He was also elected to the Connecticut Academy of Science and Engineering and the Council of Distinguished Investigators, Academy of Radiology Research. He received the Enduring Impact Award from the MICCAI Society. He co-founded the journal Medical Image Analysis and serves as its co-editor-in chief.

== Selected publications ==
- J. S. Duncan and N. Ayache, Medical image analysis: Progress over two decades and the challenges ahead, in IEEE Transactions on Pattern Analysis and Machine Intelligence, vol. 22, no. 1, pp. 85-106, Jan. 2000, doi: 10.1109/34.824822.
- X. Li, Y. Zhou, N. Dvornek, M. Zhang, S. Gao, J. Zhuang, D. Scheinost, L. Staib, P. Ventola, J. S. Duncan, BrainGNN: Interpretable Brain Graph Neural Network for fMRI Analysis, Medical Image Analysis, Volume 74, 2021, 102233, ISSN 1361-8415, doi: 10.1016/j.media.2021.102233.
- J. Zhuang, T. Tang, Y. Ding, S. Tatikonda, N. Dvornek, X. Papademetris, J. S. Duncan, Adabelief optimizer: Adapting stepsizes by the belief in observed gradients. Advances in Neural Information Processing Systems (NeurIPS), 33, 18795-18806, 2020.
- L. Staib and J. S. Duncan, Boundary finding with parametrically deformable models, in IEEE Transactions on Pattern Analysis and Machine Intelligence, vol. 14, no. 11, pp. 1061-1075, Nov. 1992, doi: 10.1109/34.166621.
