= Institut hospitalo-universitaire =

Training and medical research centers

- Founded: 2009
- Founder: Nicolas Sarkozy
- Location: Paris, Strasbourg, Marseille, Bordeaux, France
- Region served: Worldwide
- Official languages: French, English
- Key people: Nicholas Ayache, Didier Raoult
- Website: www.ihu-france.org

The Instituts hospitalo-universitaires (IHU) are medical training and research centers. They have been created by former French President Nicolas Sarkozy in 2009. The instituts hospitalo-universitaires are in partnership with universities (University of Paris, Sorbonne University, etc), hospitals as well as research laboratories both private and public.

They are located in Paris, Strasbourg, Marseille and Bordeaux.

The target is to be centers of excellence in French medical research, to train specialists in their fields of competence, to attract renowned researchers and to promote their work. Significant economic spinoffs are expected, indeed the institutes must allow "the development of innovative health products" by weaving partnerships and "increase the attractiveness of France for the health industries, thereby improving the efficiency of care by cost containment".

In November 2021, IHU Méditerranée infection research centre in Marseille identified a COVID-19 SARS-CoV-2 variant under investigation, B.1.640.2, subsequently known as the IHU variant.

In May 2022 the French medicines agency ANSM announced it would file charges against the Marseille IHU, run by Didier Raoult, for potentially criminal research misconduct during the COVID-19 pandemic.
