= Ron Kikinis =

American physician and scientist (born 1956)

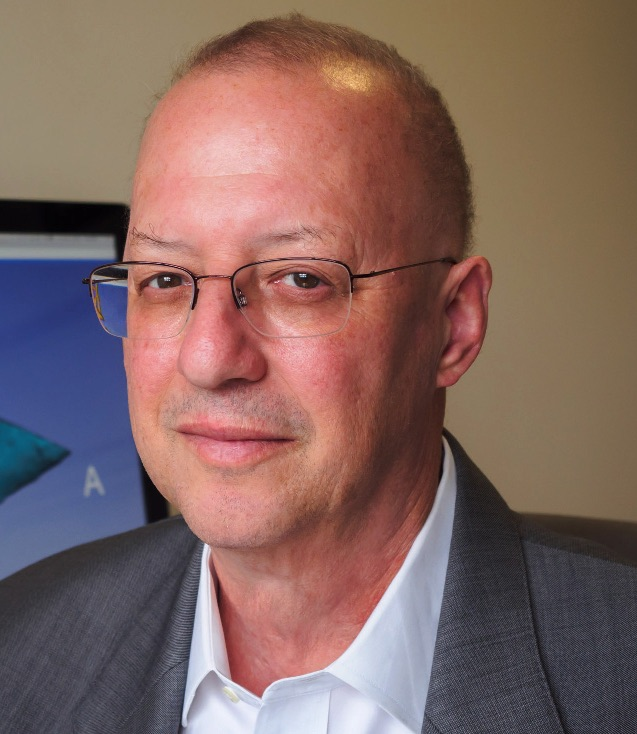
- Portrait of Ron Kikinis
- Born: March 1956 (age 70); Haifa, Israel
- Education: University of Zurich
- Known for: Medical Image Computing
- Scientific career
- Fields: Medical research, Radiology, Image guided surgery, Medical image computing, 3D Slicer, Imaging informatics
- Workplaces: Harvard Medical School; Brigham and Women's Hospital; Fraunhofer MEVIS; University of Bremen

Ron Kikinis is an American physician and scientist best known for his research in the fields of imaging informatics, image guided surgery, and medical image computing. He is the B. Leonard Holman Professor of Radiology at Harvard Medical School. Kikinis is the founding director of the Surgical Planning Laboratory in the Department of Radiology at Brigham and Women's Hospital, in Boston, Massachusetts.

== Education ==
Kikinis trained as both a physician (receiving his M.D. degree from the University of Zurich in 1982) and as a researcher in computer vision at the ETH Zurich in Switzerland. During his studies, he developed an interest in using medical imaging, image processing, visualization, and human-computer interaction to enhance the performance of physicians and improve patient care.

== Surgical Planning Laboratory ==
Relocating to the United States in 1988, he joined Brigham and Women's Hospital's Department of Radiology, under the mentorship of Ferenc A. Jolesz. In 1990, Kikinis founded the Surgical Planning Laboratory (SPL) in the Department of Radiology at BWH. The SPL is an academic laboratory focusing on basic and translational research. Kikinis established the SPL as a center for clinical collaboration with other medical specialties in the areas of radiology, surgery, and internal medicine.

Under Kikinis's leadership, the SPL has participated in collaborative research projects with hundreds of physicians, computer scientists, and other researchers at BWH and across the world. The SPL has advanced specific technologies such as image segmentation, data set registration, medical visualization, intraoperative imaging, surgical navigation, and user interfaces; tailored them to address specific medical problems; and disseminated them through open source software development in addition to traditional academic publication.

== Academic and research career ==
Kikinis was appointed professor of radiology at Harvard Medical School in 2004. In 2010 he became the Robert Greenes Distinguished Director of Biomedical Informatics in the Department of Radiology at BWH. This position was succeeded in March 2020 when he was appointed the B. Leonard Holman Professor of Radiology and Vice-Chair for Biomedical Informatics Research.".

Kikinis has directed or participated in a number of major research efforts. He served as the principal investigator (PI) of the National Alliance for Medical Image Computing (NA-MIC) a National Center for Biomedical Computing and a part of the NIH Roadmap Initiative of the National Institutes of Health. NA-MIC's unique organization under the Roadmap Initiative consisted of multiple computer science and medical teams throughout the United States.

Kikinis is PI for the Neuroimaging Analysis Center (NAC) a Biomedical Technology Resource Center funded by the NIBIB. He is director of collaborations for the National Center for Image Guided Therapy (NCIGT) at BWH, an NIH-sponsored clinical research center combining diverse imaging, computational technology, and image guided therapy within the hospital operating room. He is PI for 3DSlicer, a free, open source, cross-platform medical image processing, analysis, and visualization software platform.

In addition to his activities in the US, he was served as "Institutsleiter" (head of institute) of Fraunhofer Institute for Medical Image Computing MEVIS and Professor of Medical Image Computing at the computer science department of the University of Bremen in Germany from January 2014 through February 2020.

Kikinis has also served on numerous boards and advisory committees for research efforts worldwide.

Kikinis received the 2026 International Excellence Award of KIT.

== Publications ==
Kikinis is the author or co-author of more than of over 424 peer-reviewed articles, with an H-index well over 100. His articles have been cited over 100,000 times.
