= Nicholas Ayache =

French computer scientist

Nicholas Ayache, born on 1 November 1958 in Paris, is a French computer scientist and Research Director at INRIA, Sophia Antipolis-Mediterranean Centre. Previously, he was Scientific Director of the Institut hospitalo-universitaire de Strasbourg (2012–2015) and Visiting Professor at the Collège de France (2014). He is also a member of the French Academy of Sciences.

== Biography ==
Nicholas Ayache is a Civil Engineer from the École Nationale Supérieure des Mines de Saint-Étienne (1980), holds a Master of Science from the University of California at Los Angeles (UCLA, 1981), a PhD and a Thèse d’État (Habilitation) from the University of Paris Sud (1983 and 1988).

He is research director at Inria (Institut national de recherche en informatique et mathématiques appliquées), where he leads the EPIONE research team, dedicated to the digital patient and digital medicine. Since 2019, he has also been the Scientific Director of the Interdisciplinary Institute of Artificial Intelligence (3IA) of the Côte d'Azur.

He was a visiting professor at the Collège de France, holding the annual chair in Computer Science and Digital Sciences for the 2013–2014 academic year.

He was a visiting researcher at MIT and Harvard in 2007.

He was the scientific director of the Institut Hospitalo-Universitaire (IHU) in Strasbourg (2012–2015).

He is co-founder and co-editor of the scientific journal Medical Image Analysis.

== Research work ==
From 1981 to 1988, Nicholas Ayache sought to equip autonomous robots with new artificial vision capabilities (bulk object recognition, bi- and trinocular stereoscopic vision, navigation from visual maps). Since 1988, he has been engaged in pioneering research in the field of computer analysis of medical images, image-guided therapy and surgical simulation. A central focus of his work has been the introduction of geometric, statistical, physical or functional models of the human body for the analysis and simulation of medical images. His current research focuses on the introduction of artificial intelligence algorithms to guide the diagnosis, prognosis and therapeutic management of patients based on medical images and all available patient data (clinical, biological, behavioural, etc.).

The research work of Ayache and his collaborators has made a decisive contribution to the development of digital medicine worldwide.

== Main publications ==
- Q Zheng, H Delingette, N Duchateau, and N Ayache. 3D Consistent & Robust Segmentation of Cardiac Images by Deep Learning with Spatial Propagation. IEEE Transactions on Medical Imaging, April 2018.
- Chloé Audigier, T Mansi, H Delingette, S Rapaka, T Passerini, V Mihalef, MP Jolly, R Pop, M Diana, L Soler, A Kamen, D Comaniciu, and N Ayache. Comprehensive Pre-Clinical Evaluation of a Multi-physics Model of Liver Tumor Radiofrequency Ablation. Int J of Computer Assisted Radiology and Surgery, 2016.
- Nicholas Ayache. From medical images to digital patients, Inaugural lessons from the Collège de France. Collège de France / Fayard, 2015
- Nikos Paragios, Jim Duncan, and Nicholas Ayache. Handbook of Biomedical Imaging: Methodologies and Clinical Research. Springer, 2015.
- M. Lorenzi, X. Pennec, GB. Frisoni, and N. Ayache. Disentangling Normal Aging from Alzheimer's Disease in Structural MR Images. Neurobiology of Aging, 2014.
- H. Lombaert, JM. Peyrat, P Croisille, S Rapacchi, L Fanton, F Cheriet, P Clarysse, I Magnin, H Delingette, and N Ayache. Human Atlas of the Cardiac Fiber Architecture: Study on a Healthy Population. IEEE Trans. on Medical Imaging, 2012
- N. Ayache, H. Delingette, and M. Sermesant. The personalized digital core. Bulletin of the National Academy of Medicine, 195(8), 1855-1868, 2011.
- N. Ayache, O. Clatz, H. Delingette, G. Malandain, X. Pennec, and M. Sermesant. Asclepios: a Research Project-Team at INRIA for the Analysis and Simulation of Biomedical Images. In Y. Bertot, G. Huet, J.-J. Lévy, and G. Plotkin, editors, From semantics to computer science: essays in honor of Gilles Kahn, pages 415-436. Cambridge University Press, 2009.
- S Durrleman, X Pennec, A Trouvé, and N Ayache. Statistical Models on Sets of Curves and Surfaces based on Currents. Medical Image Analysis, 13(5):793-808, 2009.
- T. Vercauteren, X. Pennec, A. Perchant, N. Ayache, Diffeomorphic demons: efficient non-parametric image registration, NeuroImage, 45(1), 2009.
- X. Pennec, P. Fillard, N. Ayache, A Riemannian framework for tensor computing, International Journal of Computer Vision, 66 (1), 41-66, 2006.
- V Arsigny, P Fillard, X Pennec, and N Ayache. Log-Euclidean Metrics for Fast & Simple Calculus on Diffusion Tensors. Magnetic Resonance in Medicine, 56(2):411-421, 2006.
- O. Clatz, M. Sermesant, P.-Y. Bondiau, H. Delingette, S. Warfield, G. Malandain, N. Ayache, Realistic simulation of the 3-D growth of brain tumors in MRI coupling diffusion with biomech. deformation, IEEE Tr. on Medical Imaging, 24 (10), 1334-1346, 2005.
- N. Ayache (dir., with J-L. Lions and P. Ciarlet). Computational Models for the Human Body, Handbook of Numerical Analysis, 670 pages. Elsevier, 2004
- N. Ayache. Artificial Vision for Mobile robots - Stereo-vision and Multisensor Perception. MIT-Press, 1991. 342 pages
- N. Ayache. Stereoscopic Vision and Multisensory Perception: Application to mobile robotics. Inter-Editions (MASSON), 1989. 314 pages.

He has published 12 books (including one monograph) and more than 400 articles. He is the co-author of 12 patents.

Nicholas Ayache has directed (or co-directed) the theses of 80 PhD students, most of whom are employed in the field of digital imaging, mainly medical. Nine of his doctoral students received a thesis prize, including two second Gilles Kahn prizes and a second Cor Baayen prize.

== Awards and honours ==
2020 : Laureate of the International Steven Hoogendijk Award 2020.

2019: Grand Prix de la ville de Nice

2018: Free member of the French Academy of Surgery

2017: Chevalier of the Ordre des Palmes Académiques

2015: Scientific medal from the University of the French Riviera

2014: Member of the French Academy of Sciences

2014 : Winner of the Grand Prix Inria - Academy of Sciences

2013 : Winner of the MICCAI 2013 Enduring Impact Prize (Nagoya, Japan)

2012: Appointed Scientific Director of the Institut Hospitalo-Universitaire de Strasbourg

2011: Winner of the European Research Council ERC (2.5 million euros)

2009: Elected Fellow of the MICCAI Society (London)

2008: Winner of the Microsoft Prize for Science in Europe, awarded by the Royal Society (London) and the French Academy of Sciences (Paris)

2008: Elected Fellow, American Inst. for Med. and Biol. Engin. (Nat. Acad. Sc., Washington DC). 2007: Named Researcher of the Year by Le Nouvel Economiste

2006: Winner of the EADS Foundation Information Science Prize

2001-2015: 11 scientific articles awarded with a prize (including 6 major international conferences)

1999: Laval Virtual Prize for the introduction of virtual reality in surgery

1996: ECCV Computer Vision Award for transfer to industry
