= Didier Raoult =

French biology researcher (born 1952)

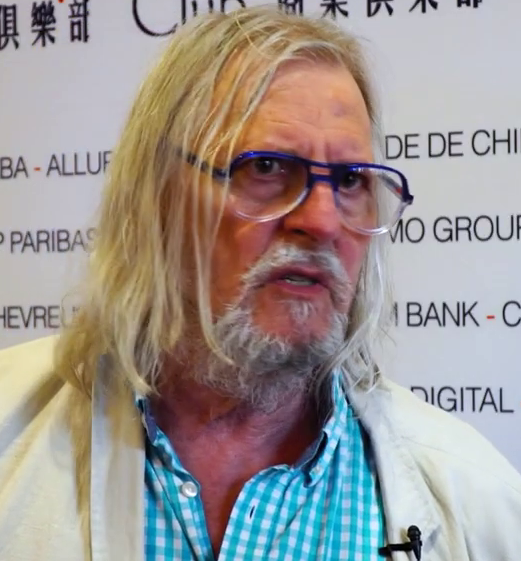
- Raoult in 2021
- Born: 13 March 1952 (age 74); Dakar, French West Africa (present-day Senegal)
- Spouse: Natacha Caïn
- Children: 3
- Scientific career
- Fields: Microbiology; Infectious disease
- Workplaces: IHU Méditerranée Infection; Aix-Marseille University

Didier Raoult (French pronunciation: [didje ʁa.ul(t)]; born 13 March 1952) is a retired French physician and microbiologist specialising in infectious diseases. He taught about infectious diseases at the Faculty of Medicine of Aix-Marseille University (AMU), and in 1984, created the Rickettsia Unit of the university. From 2008 to 2022, Raoult was the director of the Unité de Recherche sur les Maladies Infectieuses et Tropicales Emergentes. He gained significant worldwide attention during the COVID-19 pandemic for vocally promoting hydroxychloroquine as a treatment for the disease, despite lack of evidence for its effectiveness and the subsequent opposition from NIH and WHO to its use for the treatment of COVID-19 in hospitalized patients.

As of 2025, 46 of Raoult's research publications have been retracted, and at least another 218 of his publications have received an expression of concern from their publishers, due to questions related to ethics approval for his studies.

== Personal life ==
Raoult was born on 13 March 1952 in Dakar, French West Africa (present-day Senegal). Raoult's father, who came from Brittany, was serving there as a military doctor; his mother, originally from Marseille, was a nurse. His family returned to France in 1961, and settled in Marseille. He was for a time schooled in Nice, then attended a boarding school in Briançon.

A poor student, Raoult repeated a year at high school, then dropped out in the second year of high school to board a French merchant ship called Renaissance and spent the next two years at sea.

In 1972, he sat his baccalauréat in literature as an independent candidate, and registered at the medical school in Marseille. Believing in a family tradition in medicine, Raoult senior refused to pay for his studies in any other subject. Raoult had wanted to become an obstetrician after qualifying, but his grade in the resident's examination was too low for that choice. He specialised instead in infectious diseases, in the footsteps of his great-grandfather Paul Legendre (1854–1936).

In 1982, Raoult married psychiatrist and novelist Natacha Caïn (born 1960). They have two children, and Raoult has an estranged daughter from a previous marriage, angiologist Magali Carcopino-Tusoli.

== Career ==
From 2008 to 2022, Raoult was the director of the Unité de Recherche sur les Maladies Infectieuses et Tropicales Emergentes, (URMITE; in English, Infectious and Tropical Emergent Diseases Research Unit), which employs more than 200 people. He retired in the summer of 2022, after being allowed to stay on for at most one year after retiring from his professor position on August 31, 2021 upon reaching the compulsory retirement age.

Raoult was awarded the Grand prix de l'Inserm in 2010 and in 2015 shared the €450,000 prize of the Grand Prix scientifique de la Fondation Louis D. of the Institut de France with biologist Chris Bowler from the Institut de Biologie de l'Ecole Normale Supérieure in Paris. In 2003 Raoult was amongst the main co-discoverers of the Mimivirus alongside Jean-Michel Claverie. The bacteria genus Raoultella was named in his honor by his right-hand man and longest-serving collaborator, Michel Drancourt.

Raoult initiated the construction of a new building to host the IHU Méditerranée Infection, an instance of the Institut hospitalo-universitaire (IHU) network. It opened in early 2017, is dedicated to the management and study of infectious diseases and combines diagnostic, care, research and teaching activities in one location.

In May 2022 the French drug safety agency ANSM announced it would file charges against the IHU for potentially criminal research misconduct during the COVID-19 pandemic.

In June 2022, ANSM implemented "a series of particularly severe sanctions" against the Raoult-led IHU.

In September 2022 it was reported that Raoult's laboratory was being investigated by the Aix-Marseille University for "serious malfunctions," that in response to this "scientific misconduct investigation by the University of Aix Marseille" four papers from Raoult's group appearing in journals published by the American Society for Microbiology had received expressions of concern, and that a criminal investigation had been initiated.

== Citations ==
Raoult has more than 2,300 indexed publications. As of 2008, he was "classified among the ten leading French researchers by the journal Nature, for the number of his publications (more than two thousand) and for his citation number". According to ISI Web of Knowledge, he was the most cited microbiologist in Europe in 2014, and the seventh worldwide. According to the Thomson Reuters source "Highly Cited Researchers List", Raoult is among the most influential researchers in his field and his publications are among the 1% most consulted in academic journals. He is one of the 99 most cited microbiologists in the world and one of the 73 most highly cited French scientists. He is a world reference for Q fever and Whipple's disease. As of January 2022, he had over 194,000 citations and an h-index of 197. He is also on the list of the 400 most cited authors in the biomedical world. Raoult is also one of the 7.3% most self-cited authors, more than 25% of his citations coming from papers he co-authored.

Yet, Raoult's extremely uncommon and high publication rate results from his "attaching his name to nearly every paper that comes out of his institute", a practice that has been called "grossly unethical" by Steven Salzberg. Since 2013 he has been one of the overseas scientists co-affiliated with the King Abdulaziz University of Jeddah, Saudi Arabia, known to "offer highly cited researchers lucrative adjunct professorships, with minimal requirements for them to be physically present, in return for being listed by them as a secondary affiliation", and so increase its own institutional citation index.

Of the 1,836 articles published by Raoult between 1995 and 2020 (amounting to over 120 a year, or approximately one article every three days), 230 were published in two journals edited by Michel Drancourt, who was his right-hand man at the IHU and a close collaborator for over 35 years. Staff members have editorial positions at almost half the journals that have published Raoult's work. The funding of French health institutes according to their number of publications has been suggested to be at the root of his large number of publications.

== Controversies ==
=== American Society for Microbiology publishing ban ===
In 2006, Raoult and four co-authors were banned for one year from publishing in the journals of the American Society for Microbiology (ASM), after a reviewer for Infection and Immunity discovered that four figures from the revised manuscript of a paper about a mouse model for typhus were identical to figures from the originally submitted manuscript, even though they were supposed to represent a different experiment. In response, Raoult "resigned from the editorial board of two other ASM journals, canceled his membership in the American Academy of Microbiology, ASM's honorific leadership group, and banned his lab from submitting to ASM journals". In response to Science covering the story in 2012, he stated that, "I did not manage the paper and did not even check the last version". The paper was subsequently published in a different journal.

=== COVID-19 ===
On 17 March 2020, Raoult announced in an online video that a trial involving 24 patients from southeast France supported the claim that hydroxychloroquine and azithromycin were effective in treating COVID-19. On 20 March, he published a preliminary report of his study online in the International Journal of Antimicrobial Agents. The French Health Minister, Olivier Véran, was reported as announcing that "new tests will now go ahead in order to evaluate the results by Professor Raoult, in an attempt to independently replicate the trials and ensure the findings are scientifically robust enough, before any possible decision might be made to roll any treatment out to the wider public". Véran refused to endorse the study conducted by Raoult and the possible health ramifications, on the basis of a single study conducted on 24 people. The study was retracted on 17 December 2024 over a lack of informed consent for patients and after scientists—including three of its co-authors—raised concerns over methodological problems.

The French media also reported that the French pharmaceutical company Sanofi had offered French authorities millions of doses of the drug for use against COVID-19. On 3 April, the International Society of Antimicrobial Chemotherapy, which publishes the journal, issued a statement that the report on the non-blind, non-randomized study "does not meet the Society's expected standard, especially relating to the lack of better explanations of the inclusion criteria and the triage of patients to ensure patient safety."

Raoult was one of 11 prominent scientists named on 11 March to a committee to advise on scientific matters pertaining to the epidemic in France. He did not attend any of the meetings and resigned from the committee on 24 March saying that he refused to participate. He denounced the "absence of anything scientifically sound", and criticised its members for "not having a clue". He defended chloroquine as a benchmark drug for lung diseases, saying that it had suddenly been declared dangerous after having been safely used for 80 years. Following reports and a complaint filed in July by the French-speaking Society of Infectious Pathology (Spilf), the departmental council of the French Order of Physicians opened a formal case against Didier Raoult.

=== Accusations of falsified images, and legal threats ===
On 5 May 2021, Elisabeth Bik (who specializes in identifying manipulated images in scientific papers) raised concerns about dozens of Raoult's papers—including ethical, procedural, and methodological problems in a March 2020 paper reporting success in a small hydroxychloroquine trial. Raoult's lawyer subsequently announced that Raoult was accusing and suing the scientific integrity consultant of harassment and blackmail. The French non-profit association Citizen4Science, formed by scientists and citizens, published a press release and a petition that day, denouncing the harassment of scientists and defenders of science integrity, specifically defending Bik and calling on French authorities to intervene and for journalists to look into the matter. Several French newspapers immediately reported Citizen4Science's initiative. The petition was signed by thousands of scientists and others throughout the world. By 22 May 2021 Raoult had begun legal proceedings against Bik. There followed various articles in international mainstream media supporting Bik, and an article in Science updated on 4 June 2021 in issue 6546, reporting over 3,000 signatures for the Citizen4Science petition.

On 18 May 2021, Lonni Besançon, a French postdoctoral research fellow at Monash University, wrote an open letter supporting Elisabeth Bik. The letter was co-signed by more than 2200 scientists and 30 scholarly societies.

On 1 June 2021, CNRS published a press release denouncing the "judiciarization of controversy and scientific debates", condemning Raoult's legal proceedings against Elisabeth Bik. On 10 June 2021, French Senator Bernard Jomier carried the Citizen4Science press release and petition to the French Senate through a written question to French Minister of Health Olivier Véran, requiring action to protect bearers of science integrity.

In December 2022, publisher PLOS marked 48 articles by Raoult with expressions of concern "about the reported research ethics approval information and the article's adherence to PLOS research ethics policies".

In 2022, five papers received an expression of concern from publishers, warning that they may contain errors or be otherwise untrustworthy. In 2020, another paper was retracted after image manipulations were unmasked.

=== Illegal clinical trials ===
In October 2021, the Mediapart online investigative journal brought to light illegal clinical trials of a treatment against tuberculosis, which Raoult and IHU had been conducting since 2017. The trial was started without seeking the mandatory approval of the French clinical trial regulator, and continued despite its strenuous objections to its protocol when they eventually sought permission. Many of the patients in the trial were minors, homeless, or illegal residents, and therefore could not legally consent to a trial. Several suffered severe side effects such as kidney failure from the known toxicity of one of the four antibiotics combined in the trial, and at least one patient contaminated several family members because the treatment was simultaneously ineffective and poorly monitored by IHU. A subsequent investigation by the French drug safety agency (ANSM) identified grave ethics and safety breaches in IHU clinical trials. Its report was forwarded to the Marseille prosecutor for potential criminal prosecution, and ANSM additionally threatened to suspend all on-going clinical trials at IHU. The prosecutor opened a formal inquiry for falsification and forgery of documentation and for unjustified medical procedures.

In May 2023, researchers representing sixteen French organizations wrote that Raoult and his subordinates engaged in "systematic prescription of medications [...] to patients suffering from Covid-19 [...] without a solid pharmacological basis and lacking any proof of their effectiveness," and that those drugs continued to be prescribed "for more than a year after their ineffectiveness had been absolutely demonstrated."

In January 2024, BMC Microbiology retracted an article after Raoult and his co-authors failed to provide evidence of approval from an appropriate ethics committee. The American Society for Microbiology then retracted seven papers by Raoult and other authors for breaches in human ethical research where the IHU institute gave itself permission to perform studies, but did not get CPP permission, as is required in France.

In October 2024, PLOS ONE retracted several articles due to concerns about compliance with the PLOS Human Subjects Research policy, compliance with the PLOS Animal Research policy and PLOS ONE's guidelines for articles reporting observational and field studies.

== Honours and awards ==
- 2003: Knight of the Ordre des Palmes académiques (France)
- 2008: Sackler lecture award (Tel Aviv University)
- 2009: Eloi Collery Prize (Académie Nationale de Médecine)
- 2010: Grand prix de l'Inserm (France)
- 2015: Grand Prix scientifique de la Fondation Louis D. (Institut de France)
- 2021: Commander of the National Order of the Lion (Senegal)
- 2021: Rusty Razor Award for pseudoscience (The Skeptic magazine)
