= SPHARM-PDM =

Shape correspondence software package

- Developer(s): Neuro Image Research and Analysis Laboratories, University of North Carolina at Chapel Hill
- Stable release: v1.11
- Operating system: Linux or Mac OS X
- Type: Statistical Shape Analysis
- License: Freeware
- Website: SPHARM-PDM

SPHARM-PDM toolbox is a shape correspondence software package developed by the Neuro Image Research and Analysis Laboratories at the University of North Carolina at Chapel Hill. SPHARM-PDM is a tool that computes point-based models using a parametric boundary description based on spherical harmonics.

== Usage ==
The package can be used in MacOS, Linux and Windows as an external extension of 3DSlicer.

== Support ==
Free registration and installation are available. Documentation can be found on the SPHARM-PDM Wiki and support is available from the developers and community through the SPHARM-PDM forum.
