= Marius George Linguraru =

American researcher in AI for healthcare (born 1973)

- Born: 1973 (age 52–53)
- Education: DPhil (PhD) in Engineering Science and Medical Image Analysis
- Alma mater: University of Oxford

Marius George Linguraru is an American scientist specialized in artificial intelligence (AI) for healthcare. He is the Connor Family Professor and Endowed Chair in Research and Innovation at Children's National Hospital in Washington, D.C., and a Professor of Radiology and Pediatrics at the George Washington University. In 2021, he was elected to the board of directors of the Medical Image Computing and Computer Assisted Intervention (MICCAI) Society and was appointed President in 2025. He advocated for the ethical use of AI in healthcare.

== Education ==
Linguraru earned his DPhil (PhD) in Engineering Science and Medical Image Analysis from the University of Oxford in 2004, where he was a member of Keble College and received a Scatcherd European and Overseas Research Scholarship.

His postdoctoral training included research fellowships at the French Institute for Research in Computer Science and Automation (INRIA) and Harvard University.

== Career ==
=== Academic ===
Linguraru is the Connor Family Professor and Endowed Chair in Research and Innovation at Children's National Hospital in Washington, D.C., ranked in the top 5 best Children's Hospitals in the United States. He is a principal investigator and the founder of the Pediatric Accelerated Intelligence (PAI) Group at the Sheikh Zayed Institute for Pediatric Surgical Innovation. He holds appointments as Professor of Radiology and Pediatrics at the George Washington University, School of Medicine and Health Sciences.

He previously worked as a scientist at the National Institutes of Health (NIH).

=== Industry ===
Linguraru co-founded PediaMetrix Inc., a U.S.-based company that develops AI technologies for pediatric healthcare. The company's SoftSpot digital app was approved by the FDA for cranial measurements.

He created mGene, an AI-based smartphone app for screening for genetic diseases. The mGene algorithm was licensed to MGeneRx Inc., a U.S.-based company that specializes in non-invasive genetic screening.

== Scientific contributions ==
Linguraru's research interests include:

- AI algorithms for cancer diagnostics and tumor measurement in pediatric clinical trials.
- Multi-organ image analysis, non-parametric shape modeling, and quantitative analysis of complex anatomical structures.
- Deep learning applications for global health, including AI-based newborn genetic screening, diagnostics for rheumatic heart disease, and improved ultra-low field MRI quality and capacity.

== Leadership in scientific societies ==
Linguraru became president of the Medical Image Computing and Computer Assisted Intervention (MICCAI) Society board of directors in 2025, and has served in leadership roles in the IEEE Engineering in Medicine and Biology Society (EMBS), IEEE Signal Processing Society, and the International Society of Medical Information Processing and Analysis (SIPAIM).

He led the creation of the MICCAI Society Mentorship Program, a program that supports mentorship for early-career scientists worldwide.

He has served as Chair and co-organizer of international conferences and events, including MICCAI 2022, MICCAI 2023, MICCAI 2024, IEEE-ISBI 2021, IEEE-ISBI 2023, and the first AFRICAI Summer School (2023). His work has included initiatives supporting mentorship and global research capacity-building.

== Policy and global impact ==
Linguraru has contributed to global health AI policy through participation in World Bank and science diplomacy events, and by co-authoring the first consensus guidelines for trustworthy AI implementation in healthcare, known as the FUTURE-AI framework, published in The BMJ. He also contributed to one of the largest federated learning studies, published in Nature Medicine, that demonstrated how distributed AI models can protect privacy and improve access to data from smaller or vulnerable populations.

== Awards and honors ==
- MICCAI Fellow (2025)
- Distinguished Service Award, IEEE EMBS (2025)
- Distinguished Lecturer, IEEE EMBS (2016–2018)
- First Prize, International Pediatric Brain Tumor Segmentation Challenge – BraTS-PEDS (2023)
- First Prize, International Brain Tumor Segmentation Challenge on Sub-Saharan Africa Glioma – BraTS-Africa (2024)

== Personal life ==
Linguraru was born in 1973 and has lived and worked in Romania, the United Kingdom, France, and the United States.

== Media coverage ==
Linguraru's work has been featured by The Economist, The Washington Post, The Times (London), PBS, and Voice of America

== Selected publications ==
- Lekadir K, Frangi AF, Porras AR, et al. FUTURE-AI: International Consensus Guideline for Trustworthy and Deployable Artificial Intelligence in Healthcare. BMJ. 2025;388:e081554. doi:10.1136/bmj-2024-081554
- Fathi Kazerooni A, Khalili N, Liu X, et al. BraTS-PEDs: Results of the Multi-Consortium International Pediatric Brain Tumor Segmentation Challenge 2023. Machine Learning for Biomedical Imaging. 2025;3:72–87. doi:10.59275/j.melba.2025-f6fg
- Linguraru MG, Bakas S, Aboian M, et al. Clinical, Cultural, Computational, and Regulatory Considerations to Deploy AI in Radiology: Perspectives of RSNA and MICCAI Experts. Radiol Artif Intell. 2024;6(4):e240225. doi:10.1148/ryai.240225
- Brown K, Roshanitabrizi P, Rwebembera J, et al. Using Artificial Intelligence for Rheumatic Heart Disease Detection by Echocardiography: Focus on Mitral Regurgitation. J Am Heart Assoc. 2024;13(2):e031257. doi:10.1161/JAHA.123.031257
- Dayan I, Roth HR, Zhong A, et al. Federated Learning for Predicting Clinical Outcomes in Patients with COVID-19. Nat Med. 2021;27(10):1735–1743. doi:10.1038/s41591-021-01506-3
- Porras AR, Rosenbaum K, Tor-Diez C, Summar M, Linguraru MG. Development and Evaluation of a Machine Learning-based Point-of-care Screening Tool for Genetic Syndromes in Children: A Multinational Retrospective Study. Lancet Digit Health. 2021;3(10):e635–e643. doi:10.1016/S2589-7500(21)00137-0
- Cerrolaza JJ, Picazo ML, Humbert L, et al. Computational Anatomy for Multi-organ Analysis in Medical Imaging: A Review. Med Image Anal. 2019;56:44–67. doi:10.1016/j.media.2019.04.002

== See also ==
- Medical Imaging
- Artificial intelligence in healthcare
- Rare disease
- Global Health
