= Polina Golland =

Researcher in biomedical image analysis Israeli-American

- פולינה גולנד
- Education: Technion; MIT
- Scientific career
- Workplaces: MIT
- Thesis: Statistical Shape Analysis of Anatomical Structures (2001)
- Doctoral advisor: Eric Grimson

Polina Golland (Hebrew: פולינה גולנד; born 1971) is an Israeli-American computer scientist specializing in medical image computing and biomedical image analysis. She is Henry Ellis Warren (1894) Professor of Electrical Engineering and Computer Science at the Massachusetts Institute of Technology (MIT), and heads the medical vision group at the MIT Computer Science and Artificial Intelligence Laboratory.

== Education and career ==
After studying computer science at the Technion – Israel Institute of Technology and earning bachelor's and master's degrees there, Golland went to the Massachusetts Institute of Technology for doctoral study, earning a Ph.D. in 2001 with the dissertation Statistical Shape Analysis Of Anatomical Structures supervised by Eric Grimson. She joined the MIT faculty in 2003.

== Recognition ==
Golland was named Henry Ellis Warren (1894) Professor in 2018. She was elected as a Fellow of the American Institute for Medical and Biological Engineering in 2021, "for outstanding contributions to the development of novel techniques for biomedical image analysis and understanding".
