= Alejandro Frangi =

Argentinian engineer and scientist

- Engineering career
- Employer: University of Manchester
- Awards: FREng

Professor Alejandro (Alex) Frangi FREng, sometimes Alejandro Frangi Caregnato, is an Argentinian engineer and scientist and a pioneered in computational medicine. He specialises in the engineering of machine learning for medical image analysis and modelling. He has published over 850 peer-reviewed articles in his field. From the University of Sheffield, UK, he was named Fellow of the Institute of Electrical and Electronics Engineers (IEEE) in 2014 "for contributions to medical image analysis and image-based computational physiology." He holds Ph.D. from Image Sciences Institute, University Medical Center Utrecht and BEng in telecommunications engineering from the Polytechnic University of Catalonia.

== Education ==
He moved to Barcelona in 1991, where he obtained his undergraduate degree in Telecommunications Engineering from the Technical University of Catalonia in 1996. Frangi obtained grants from both Dutch Ministry of Economic Affairs and CIRIT to pursue his PhD.

== Career ==
Early in his career, Frangi was a visiting researcher at Imperial College, London. He also worked at Philips Medical Systems BV, The Netherlands. He currently serves as Bicentenary Turing Chair in Computational Medicine at the University of Manchester. Frangi also serves as Chair in Emerging Technologies for The Royal Academy of Engineering. He also holds visiting positions at KU Leuven, ShanghaiTech and Shenzhen University.

== Research ==
Frangi's most notable research and development was in the field of in silico clinical trials. These clinical trials can be completed digitally and can also model and predict outcomes in the form of a computerised simulation. In April 2023, Frangi's research project INSILICO received a grant from the European Research Council. The research involves simulating clinical trials using "digital twins." It is hoped that technology breakthroughs in this field could reduce both the time and cost of some trials.
