= International Journal of Computer Assisted Radiology and Surgery =

- Discipline: Health informatics
- Language: English

Publication details
- Publisher: Springer
- Impact factor: 2.473 (2019)

Standard abbreviations
- ISO 4: Int. J. Comput. Assist. Radiol. Surg.

Indexing
- ISSN: 1861-6410 (print); 1861-6429 (web)

Links
- Journal homepage

The International Journal of Computer Assisted Radiology and Surgery (IJCARS) is a journal for cross-disciplinary research, development and applications of Computer Assisted Radiology and Surgery (CARS). The Journal promotes interdisciplinary research and development in an international environment with a focus on the development of digital imaging and computer-based diagnostic and therapeutic procedures as well enhance the skill levels of health care professionals.
The International Society for Computer Aided Surgery (ISCAS) and The Medical Image Computing and Computer Assisted Interventions Society (MICCAI) are involved in the publication of the IJCARS.
