= Leo Joskowicz =

Israeli computer scientist

- לאו יוסקוביץ
- Born: 1961 (age 64–65)
- Education: Technion – Israel Institute of Technology, New York University
- Known for: Medical imaging, Computer-assisted surgery
- Scientific career
- Fields: Computer Science
- Workplaces: Hebrew University of Jerusalem
- Doctoral advisor: Ernest Davis

Leo Joskowicz (Hebrew: לאו יוסקוביץ; born 1961) is a Mexican–Israeli computer scientist specializing in medical imaging and computer-assisted surgery. He is a professor in the Rachel and Selim Benin School of Computer Science and Engineering at the Hebrew University of Jerusalem, and former president of The MICCAI Society.

== Education and career ==
Joskowicz grew up in Mexico, and attended a French-language school in Mexico City. He went to Israel for undergraduate studies in computer science at the Technion – Israel Institute of Technology, graduating in 1983, and then moved to New York City for graduate study at the Courant Institute of Mathematical Sciences of New York University. After a 1984 master's degree under the supervision of M. C. Harrison, he completed his PhD in 1988 with the dissertation Reasoning about Shape and Kinematic Function in Mechanical Devices supervised by Ernest Davis.

He worked for IBM Research at the Thomas J. Watson Research Center from 1988 to 1995, when he returned to Israel as a senior lecturer at the Hebrew University of Jerusalem. He became an associate professor in 2000 and full professor in 2006, directed the Leibniz Center for Research in Computer Science from 2001 to 2009, and has been a member of the Edmond and Lily Safra Center for Brain Sciences since 2007. He has also held visiting professorships at the Instituto Tecnológico Autónomo de México, National Autonomous University of Mexico, and Chiba University in Japan.

He was president of The MICCAI Society from 2019 to 2022.

== Recognition ==
Joskowicz was elected as an IEEE Fellow in 2013, "for contributions to computer assisted surgery and medical image processing". He has been an ASME Fellow since 2012, and a Fellow of The MICCAI Society since 2017.
