= International Society for Computer Aided Surgery =

Coordinates: 51.79965°N 0.80235°W

- Abbreviation: ISCAS
- Type: International nongovernmental organization
- Purpose: Humanitarian computer-assisted surgery
- Region served: Worldwide
- Official language: English
- President: Kensaku Mori
- Main organ: Council of ISCAS
- Website: http://iscas.co/

The International Society for Computer Aided Surgery (ISCAS) is an international non-governmental organization, whose purpose to promote all scientific and clinical advance of computer-aided surgery and related medical procedures around the world.

== Objectives ==
- Promoting technological basic and clinical research in that area
- Promote a multidisciplinary approach, information exchange and cooperation between members of the association
- Contribution to the promotion of technology transfer by industries related to computer-aided surgery and related medical procedures
- Participation in certain educational scheme for scientists, engineers and healthcare professionals as well as for young researchers in that area

== Activities ==
=== Congresses, symposia, seminars ===
To reach the purposes, regular meetings with contributions from specialists in medicine, engineers, physicists and computer scientists from universities, hospitals, research institutions and industry are organized e. g. during the CARS (Computer Assisted Radiology and Surgery), an annual and international scientific conference, initiated in 1983 by the Senate of Berlin

=== Journals ===
ISCAS is involved in the publication of International Journal of Computer Assisted Radiology and Surgery by Springer

=== ISCAS accreditation ===
The objective of the accreditation procedure is the assessment, improvement and public recognition of programmes or funding bodies for research and training in Computer Assisted Surgery (CAS), to enhance the quality of teaching and learning as well as to improve research and professional practice.

=== Awards and scholarships ===
The society grants the following awards and scholarships to support young scientists and to recognize outstanding scientific work:

- ISCAS-CARS Best Student Poster Awards
- Olympus ISCAS Best Paper Award
- ISCAS student scholarships
- Koh Young young investigator scholarship
- Kikuchi frugal technology award

== Members ==
- Active Members

Each person in the professional areas, engineering, healthcare, from scientific and industrial areas related to computer-assisted surgery and related medical interventions can be an active member.

- Associate Members

Each national or international association with similar objectives, as well as any educational institution, industry, company or organization that is active in the area may apply for associate membership and become an affiliated society.

- Honorary Members

Persons who distinguished themselves by special performance or substantially contributed to the development of the society have to be appointed as honorary members (without any obligation to pay membership fees).

== See also ==
- The MICCAI Society
