= Gabor Fichtinger =

Gabor Fichtinger is an electrical engineer from Queens University in Kingston, Ontario. He was named a Fellow of the Institute of Electrical and Electronics Engineers (IEEE) in 2016 for his contributions to medical robotics and computer-assisted intervention.
