= Computer-assisted interventions =

Computer-assisted interventions (CAI) is a field of research and practice, where medical interventions are supported by computer-based tools and methodologies. Examples include medical robotics

== Description ==
In the computer-assisted interventions (CAI) field of research and practice, medical interventions are supported by computer-based tools and methodologies. The basic paradigm of patient-specific interventional medicine is a closed loop process, consisting of

1. combining specific information about the patient with the physician's general knowledge to determine the patient's condition;
2. formulating a plan of action;
3. carrying out this plan; and
4. evaluating the results.

The experience gathered over many patients may be combined to improve treatment plans and protocols for future patients. Computer-based technology assists medical professional in processing and acting on complex information.

== Examples ==
Examples include:

- Medical robotics
- Surgical and interventional navigation
- Imaging and image processing methods for CAI
- Clinical feasibility studies of computer-enhanced interventions
- Tracked and guided biopsies
- Alignment of pre-procedure images with the patient during the procedure
- Intraoperative decision supports
- Skill analysis and workflow studies in CAI
- Clinical studies of CAI showing first-in-man or early efficacy results
- User interfaces and visualization systems for CAI
- Surgical and interventional systems
- Novel surgical devices and sensors
- User performance studies
- Validation and evaluation of CAI technology

== Medical robotics ==
CAI with medical robotics includes robotic and telerobotic interventions.

== Surgical and interventional navigation ==
CAI can be used for alignment of pre-procedure images with the patient during the procedure.

== Surgical process modeling and analysis ==
In order to gain an explicit and formal understanding of surgery, the field of analyses and modelling of surgical procedures has recently emerged. The challenge is to support the surgeon and the surgical procedure through the understanding of Operating Room (OR) activities, with the help of sensor- or human-based systems. Related surgical models can then be introduced into a new generation of Computer-Assisted Interventions systems to improve the management of complex multimodal information, improve surgical workflows, increase surgical efficiency and the quality of care in the OR. Models created by these different approaches may have a large impact in future surgical innovations, whether for planning, intra-operative or post-operative purposes.

This idea of describing the surgical procedure as a sequence of tasks was first introduced by MacKenzie et al. (2001). and formalised in Jannin et al., 2001. The term Surgical Process (SP) has been defined as a set of one or more linked procedures or activities that collectively realise a surgical objective within the context of an organisational structure defining functional roles and relationships. This term is generally used to describe the steps involved in a surgical procedure. A Surgical Process Model (SPM) has been defined as a simplified pattern of an SP that reflects a predefined subset of interest of the SP in a formal or semi-formal representation. It relates to the performance of an SP with support from a workflow management system.

Surgical process models are described from observer based acquisition, or sensor-based acquisition (such as signals, or videos,).

== Surgical and interventional systems ==
Surgical and interventional systems used with CAI include:

- Novel surgical devices and sensors
- User interface and ergonomics
- Visualization systems for CAI
- Validation and evaluation of CAI technology
  - Clinical studies of CAI showing first-in-man or early efficacy results
  - Clinical feasibility studies of computer-enhanced interventions

== CAI related scientific societies, conferences and journals ==
=== MICCAI ===
The Medical Image Computing and Computer Assisted Intervention Society (the MICCAI Society) is a professional association for medical image computing and computer-assisted medical interventions including biomedical imaging and robotics,

==== ISCAS ====
The International Society for Computer Assisted Surgery (ISCAS) is a non-profit association of practitioners of computer-aided surgery and related medical interventions

Its scope encompasses all fields within surgery, as well as biomedical imaging and instrumentation, and digital technology employed as an adjunct to imaging in diagnosis, therapeutics, and surgery.

==== iSMIT ====
The International Society for Medical Innovation and Technology is focused on the advancement of minimally invasive therapy.

=== International conferences ===
==== MICCAI ====
MICCAI organizes an annual conference and associated workshops. Proceedings for this conference are published by Springer in the Lecture Notes in Computer Science series. General topics of the conference include medical image computing, computer-assisted intervention, guidance systems and robotics, visualization and virtual reality, computer-aided diagnosis, bioscience and biology applications, specific imaging systems, and new imaging applications.

==== IPCAI ====
International Conference on Information Processing in Computer-Assisted Interventions (IPCAI) is a premiere international forum for technical innovations, system development and clinical studies in computer-assisted interventions. IPCAI includes papers presenting novel technical concepts, clinical needs and applications as well as hardware, software and systems and their validation.

==== CARS ====
The Computer Assisted Radiology and Surgery (CARS) congress is the CARS annual conference. Founded in 1985, CARS has focused on research and development on novel algorithms and systems and their applications in radiology and surgery. Its growth and impact is due to CARS's close collaboration with the ISCAS and EuroPACS societies, and CAR, CAD and CMI organizations.

== See also ==
- Information literacy
