= Imaging informatics =

Imaging informatics, also known as radiology informatics or medical imaging informatics, is a subspecialty of biomedical informatics that aims to improve the efficiency, accuracy, usability and reliability of medical imaging services within the healthcare enterprise. It is devoted to the study of how information about and contained within medical images is retrieved, analyzed, enhanced, and exchanged throughout the medical enterprise.

As radiology is an inherently data-intensive and technology-driven specialty, those in this branch of medicine have become leaders in Imaging Informatics. However, with the proliferation of digitized images across the practice of medicine to include fields such as cardiology, ophthalmology, dermatology, surgery, gastroenterology, obstetrics, gynecology and pathology, the advances in Imaging Informatics are also being tested and applied in other areas of medicine. Various industry players and vendors involved with medical imaging, along with IT experts and other biomedical informatics professionals, are contributing and getting involved in this expanding field.

Imaging informatics exists at the intersection of several broad fields:

- biological science – includes bench sciences such as biochemistry, microbiology, physiology and genetics
- clinical services – includes the practice of medicine, bedside research, including outcomes and cost-effectiveness studies, and public health policy
- information science – deals with the acquisition, retrieval, cataloging, and archiving of information
- medical physics / biomedical engineering – entails the use of equipment and technology for a medical purpose
- cognitive science – studying human computer interactions, usability, and information visualization
- computer science – studying the use of computer algorithms for applications such as computer assisted diagnosis and computer vision

Due to the diversity of the industry players and broad professional fields involved with Imaging Informatics, there grew a demand for new standards and protocols. These include DICOM (Digital Imaging and Communications in Medicine), Health Level 7 (HL7), International Organization for Standardization (ISO), and Artificial Intelligence protocols.

Current research surrounding Imaging Informatics has a focus on Artificial Intelligence (AI) and Machine Learning (ML). These new technologies are being used to develop automation methods, disease classification, advanced visualization techniques, and improvements in diagnostic accuracy. However, AI and ML integration faces several challenges with data management and security.

== History ==
=== Medical imaging to imaging informatics ===
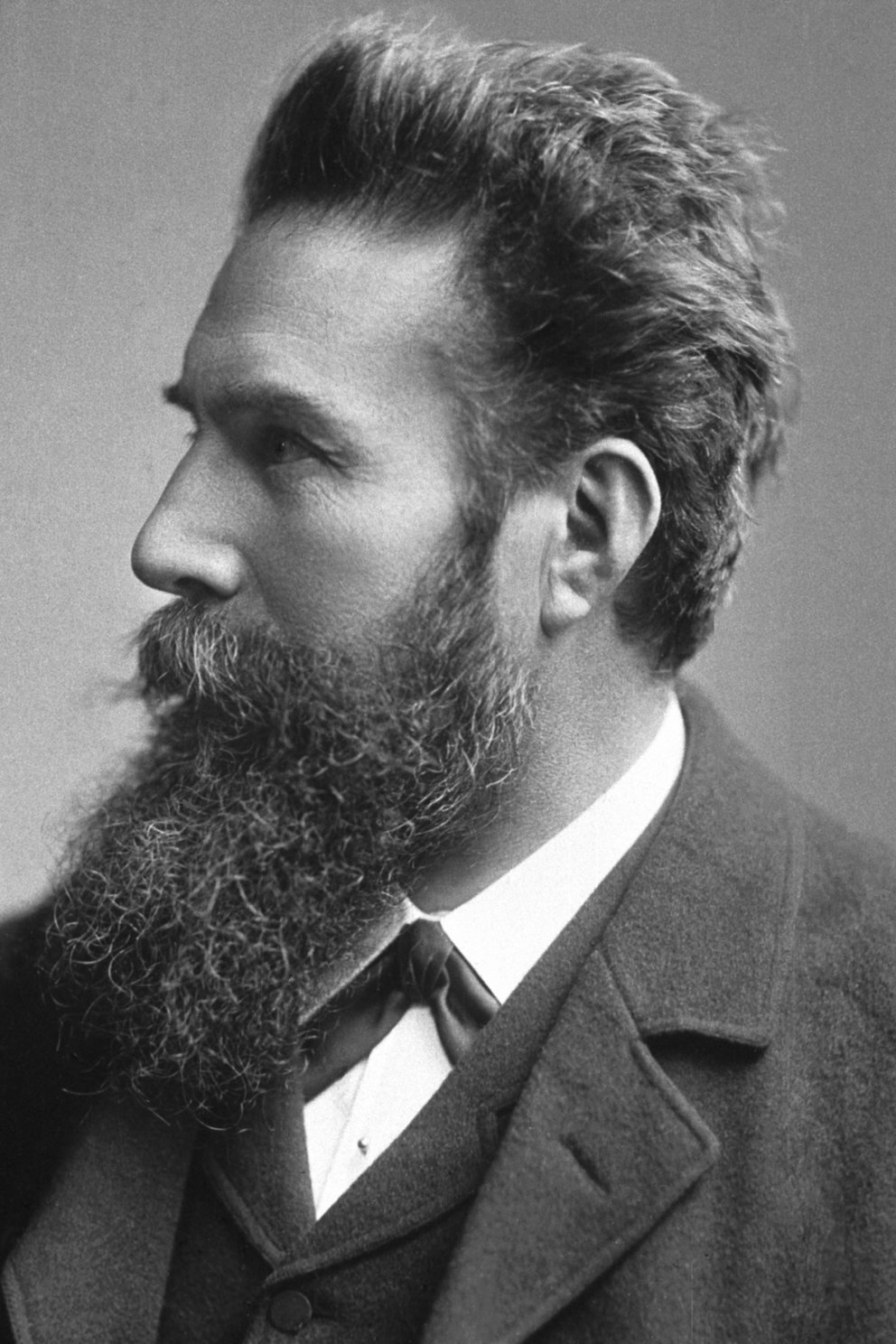
Wilhelm Röntgen

While the field of imaging informatics is based around the power of modern computing, its roots trace back to the dawn of the 20th century. On November 8, 1895, German physicist Wilhelm Conrad Röntgen observed a new imaging technique he coined "X-rays" during his experiments. This discovery led to the creation of the medical imaging field, and in turn launched a new wave of human innovation.

X-rays stood as the only medical imaging technology for several decades following its discovery. However, the arrival of the mid 20th century meant the expansion of the medical imaging field. The new modalities included: computed tomography (CT) to visualize soft tissue with a high degree of resolution; Magnetic Resonance Imaging (MRI) which is a modern standard for soft tissue imaging; Ultrasound that uses sound waves to create less expensive visualizations; Nuclear Imaging and Hybrid Scanners for functional imaging and imaging with higher spatial resolution created by combining multiple modalities.

As these imaging techniques became more sophisticated, the amount of information that medical imaging professionals were expected to process also increased. Additionally, the digital revolution of the mid to late 20th century further increased the data these techniques could gather. As a result, the main limiting factor for the medical imaging field became the human inability to accurately interpret large amounts of data. Thus, the need arose for computerized assistance with complex digital imaging analysis, storage and manipulation. Modern Imaging Informatics was developed to fulfill these needs.

=== Imaging informatics development ===
Imaging Informatics is a broad field with numerous areas of interest, making its development a culmination of the development of various individual technologies. Several of the key innovations for the field are as follows:

==== Picture archiving and communication system (PACS) ====
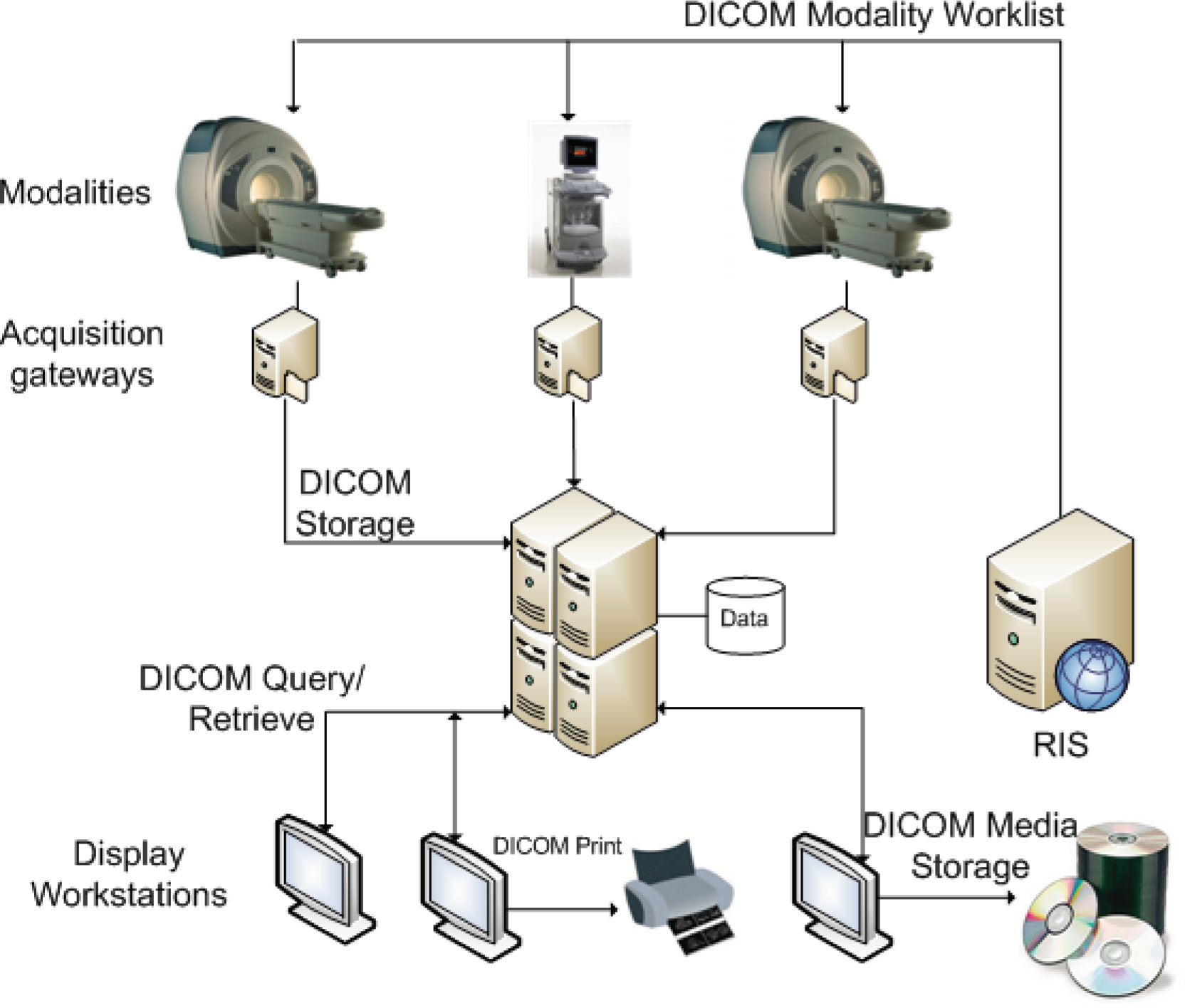
Overview of a PACS system and a visualization of its interactions with the RIS and DICOM.

The development of PACS popularized the use of image storage and retrieval systems in medical practices. Moreover, this new technology demanded the development of others. The world quickly realized that digital imaging standards would need to be put in place given the impact PACS had on the medical community. The American College of Radiology (ACR) and the National Electrical Manufacturers Association (NEMA) created the Digital Imaging and Communications Standards Committee (later becoming DICOM) in response to this concern.

==== Information technology integration ====
The digital age's impact on radiology resulted in a large influx of data that needed to be managed. To combat this, the field of information technology was incorporated with technology such as Radiology Information System (RIS) and Hospital Information System (HIS). These systems would work in tandem with PACS and other imaging technology to streamline the patient data management, as shown in the figure to the right.

==== Computer-aided detection and diagnosis ====
The idea of computer-aided detection (CAD) and computer-aided diagnosis (CADx) is that the process of analysis and interpretation of medical image data could be automated, with a potentially higher degree of accuracy than human detection and diagnosis. Interest in this subject dates back to 1966, when radiology imaging first became digitized. The first successful implementation of a CAD system was in 1994 at the University of Chicago for use in mammography. This was followed by the first commercial CAD system in 1998 called ImageChecker M1000. With the arrival of the 21st century, machine learning techniques have been utilized to accomplish a version of the CAD and CADx systems. The future development of these technologies is advantageous as it gives a solution to human limitations in medical image processing. Although a highly accurate and fully automated CAD system has yet to be realized, recent advancements in Artificial Intelligence may allow for functioning implementations.

== Standards and protocols ==
In the domain of imaging informatics, it is imperative to ascertain that the information pertaining to industry standards and data-sharing protocols is contemporaneous. The expeditious advancement in this field necessitates a vigilant approach to sustain uniformity, foster interoperability, and guarantee the efficacious dissemination of imaging data. To this end, several pivotal facets warrant rigorous consideration:

=== Digital imaging and communications in medicine (DICOM) standards ===
The Digital Imaging and Communications in Medicine (DICOM) standard delineates a sophisticated structural schema that integrates medical imaging data with pertinent patient identifiers into unified data sets, analogous to the embedded metadata in JPEG images. Such DICOM entities are constituted by a multitude of attributes, notably encapsulating pixel data, which in certain imaging modalities, corresponds to discrete images or, alternatively, an array of frames exemplifying kinetic or volumetric data, as observed in cine loops or multi-dimensional scans in nuclear medicine. This architecture accommodates the assimilation of intricate, multi-faceted data into a monolithic DICOM file. The standard accommodates a spectrum of pixel data compression algorithms, including but not limited to JPEG and JPEG 2000, and provisionally allows for holistic data set compression. DICOM specifies three encodings for data elements, with a predilection for explicit value representations, barring specific exceptions as elaborated in Part 5 of the DICOM compendium. Uniformly applied across diverse applications, the file manifestation customarily incorporates a header that houses essential attributes and data on the originating application.

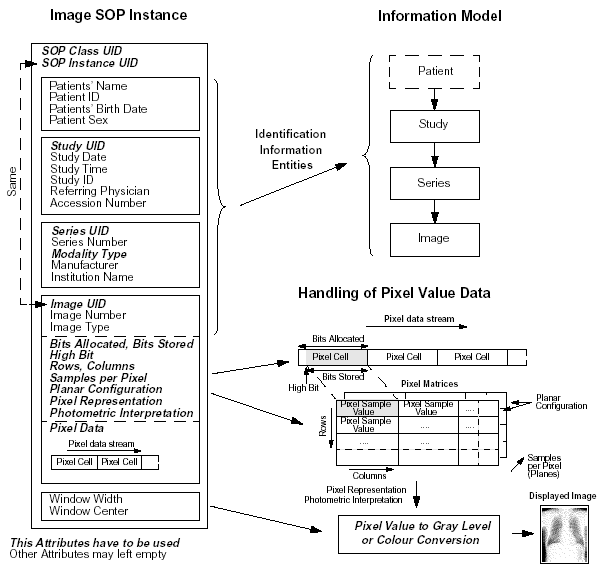
DICOM InfoModel

The proposed workflow integrates the use of DICOM Structured Reporting (SR), in which essential measurements are encoded as DICOM SR objects. These objects are then used to fill a predefined SR template, resulting in the creation of a standardized report composed of discrete data elements. This report is subsequently transmitted to the Electronic Medical Record (EMR) system. The discrete data extracted from these reports facilitate the longitudinal monitoring of individual patient metrics, are forwarded to data registries, or are leveraged for clinical research purposes.

=== Health level 7 (HL7) standards ===
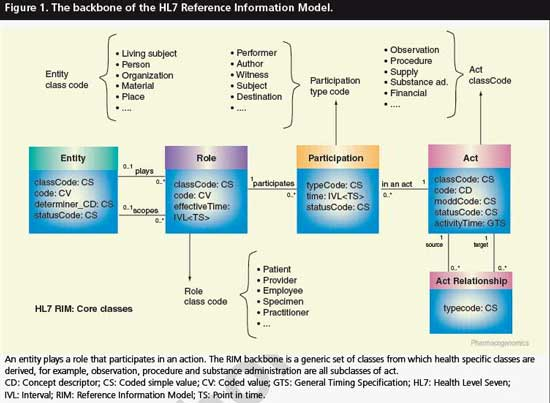
HL7 Reference Information Model

DDInteract has been crafted to enhance cooperative engagement between healthcare practitioners and patients, aiming to ascertain the optimal therapeutic approach that minimizes the hazards posed by potential drug-drug interactions. The user interface of DDInteract is systematically organized into four distinct segments.

Medication data can be represented across a variety of Fast Health Interoperability Resources (FHIR) resources, necessitating careful analysis by DDInteract. Specifically, MedicationRequest is utilized for medications prescribed to the patient; MedicationDispense covers medications that have been physically provided to the patient; and MedicationStatement pertains to medications that the patient reports having taken or is currently taking. It is possible for a single medication to be represented in multiple resource forms, with potential redundancies being amalgamated into a single record based on the most recent date and a defined hierarchy among the resource types.

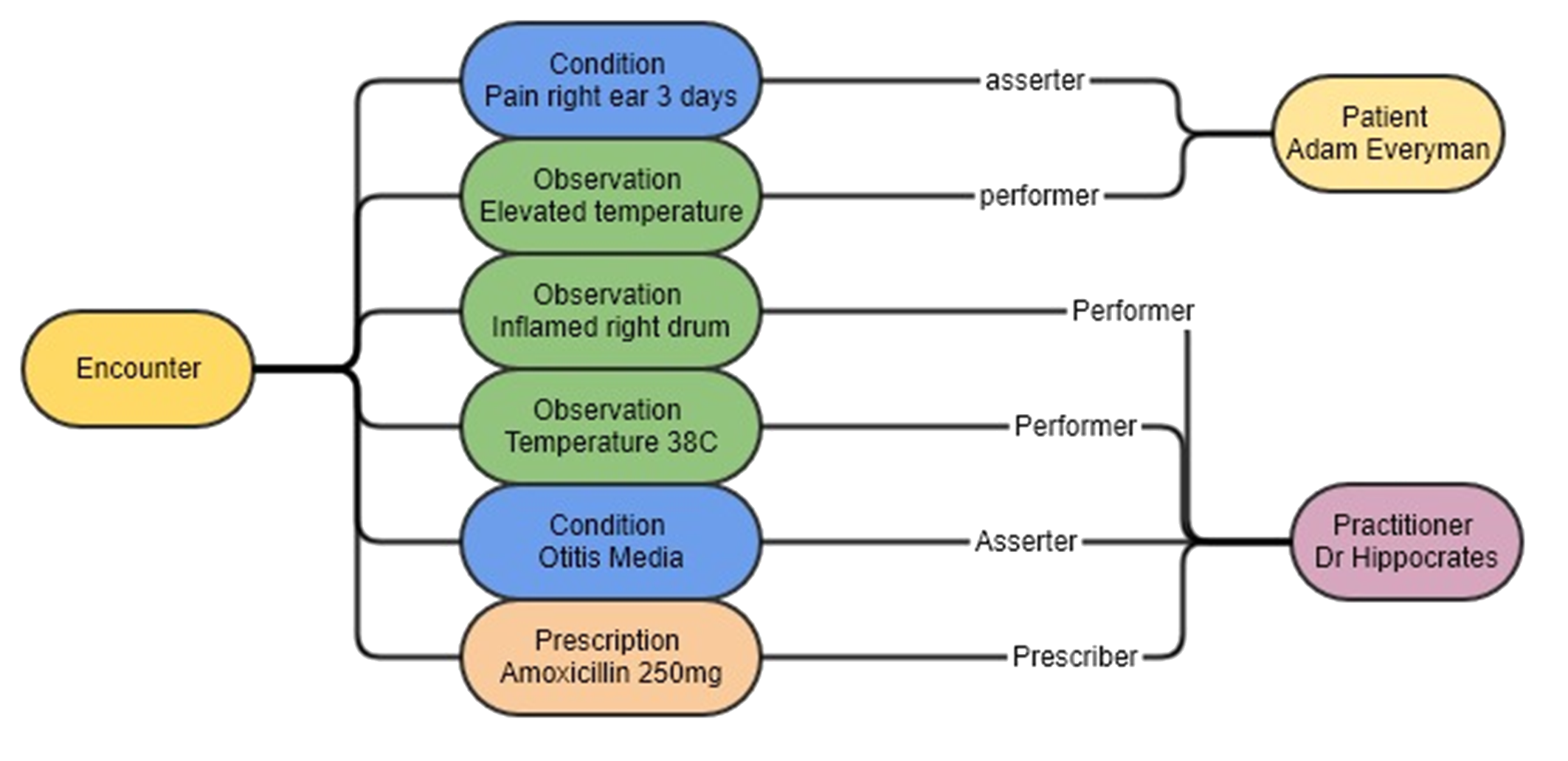
FHIR resource graph

To optimize the efficiency of data retrieval from the FHIR server, not every instance of medication is considered. Only those resources that are currently active or were active within the past 100 days are included, adhering to the prevalent U.S. protocol that typically allows for medication dispensation for a duration not exceeding three months.

=== International organization for standardization (ISO) standards ===
A Quality Management System (QMS) is an integrative construct that includes the organizational architecture, the allocation of resources, the expertise of personnel, and the repository of documents and procedures that collectively contribute to the assurance and enhancement of quality in an entity's offerings. It delineates a suite of systematically orchestrated actions essential for governing and optimizing quality parameters. The ISO 9000 suite emerges as the preeminent and universally endorsed schema for QMS implementations, whereas the ISO 15189 standard provides a specialized framework designed expressly for the exigencies of clinical laboratory settings.

=== Artificial intelligence in imaging informatics ===
A systematic review critically assessed the design, reporting standards, risk of bias, and validity of claims within studies that compare the efficacy of diagnostic deep learning algorithms in medical imaging against the expertise of clinicians. Conducted using data from prominent databases spanning from 2010 to June 2019, the review specifically targeted studies involving convolutional neural networks (CNNs)—notable for their capacity to autonomously discern crucial features for image classification within medical contexts. The investigation uncovered a notable deficiency in randomized clinical trials concerning this subject, identifying only ten such studies, of which merely two were published, exhibiting low risk of bias and commendable adherence to reporting protocols. Among the 81 non-randomized studies located, a minority were prospective or validated in practical clinical settings, with the majority presenting a high risk of bias, substandard compliance with reporting norms, and a pronounced lack of accessibility to data and code. This review underscores the imperative for an augmentation in the number of prospective studies and randomized trials, advocating for diminished bias, amplified clinical pertinence, enhanced transparency, and tempered conclusions in the burgeoning field of applying deep learning to medical imaging.

The exponential growth in digital data alongside enhanced computing capabilities has markedly accelerated advancements in artificial intelligence (AI), which are now progressively being incorporated into healthcare. These AI applications aim to refine diagnosis, treatment, and prognosis through sophisticated classification and prediction models. Nevertheless, the evolution of these technologies is impeded by a lack of rigorous reporting standards relating to data sourcing, model architecture, and the methodologies employed in model evaluation and validation. In response, we propose MINIMAR (Minimum Information for Medical AI Reporting), an initiative designed to establish critical parameters for understanding AI-driven predictions, the demographics targeted, inherent biases, and the ability to generalize these technologies. We urge the adoption of standardized protocols to ensure that AI implementations in healthcare are reported with accuracy and responsibility, facilitating the development and deployment of associated clinical decision-support tools while simultaneously addressing critical concerns regarding precision and bias.

As a foundational requisite, the proposed standard ought to fulfill several essential criteria: Firstly, it should encompass comprehensive details concerning the population from which the training data are derived, delineating the sources of data and the methods employed for cohort selection. Secondly, the demographics of the training data should be explicitly documented to facilitate a substantive comparison with the demographic characteristics of the population on which the model is intended to operate. Thirdly, there should be a thorough disclosure of the model's architecture and its development process to allow for a clear interpretation of the model's intended purpose, comparison with analogous models, and to enable exact replication. Fourthly, the process of model evaluation, optimization, and validation must be transparently reported to elucidate the means by which local model optimization is attained and to support replication and the sharing of resources.

Reporting standards for Model evaluation of artificial intelligence solutions in health care
Optimization	Model or parameter tuning applied	Generated vectors with a dimension of 300 and a window size of 5	Documented and provided for all models in detail
Internal model validation	Study internal validation	Internal 10-fold cross-validation	Hold-out validation set
External model validation	External validation using data from another setting	Not performed	Not performed
Transparency	How code and data are shared with the community.	Code and sample data available via GitHub	Data is not available; code is available via GitHub

==== Evaluation of artificial intelligence in imaging informatics ====
===== Advantages =====
- Improved Diagnostic Accuracy: Artificial intelligence, particularly through the use of convolutional neural networks (CNNs), has transformed medical imaging by significantly enhancing the accuracy of diagnostics. These technologies excel at autonomously identifying pertinent features from imaging data, thereby augmenting diagnostic, prognostic, and therapeutic strategies.
- Operational Efficiency: AI's capability to swiftly analyze extensive imaging datasets exceeds human capacity and offers the potential to decrease the interval between imaging and diagnosis, ultimately benefiting patient care.
- Consistency and Replicability: Initiatives such as MINIMAR are crucial as they promote standardized reporting and deployment of AI in healthcare, thereby improving the consistency and replicability of AI-driven diagnostic tools across various clinical environments.

===== Disadvantages =====
- Inadequate Clinical Validation: A significant gap in clinical validation for AI tools is highlighted by the limited number of randomized clinical trials that compare the performance of AI systems directly with human clinicians, where many studies show high risk of bias and poor adherence to established reporting standards.
- Accessibility of Resources: The prevalent issue of limited access to the datasets and algorithms used in AI research impedes the ability of the broader scientific community to validate, replicate, and innovate upon existing studies.
- Transparency and Ethical Concerns: AI development in medical imaging faces challenges in transparency regarding how models are built, trained, and validated. Additionally, there is a pressing concern about the potential for these models to propagate existing biases or introduce new biases if not properly checked.

===== Recommendations for future development =====
- Expansion of Rigorous Trials: The field requires a substantial increase in prospective, well-designed randomized trials to thoroughly assess and validate AI applications in clinical settings.
- Standardization of Reporting: Implementing comprehensive reporting standards as proposed by initiatives like MINIMAR will address transparency issues, reduce biases, and enhance the generalizability of AI applications, ensuring they meet rigorous scientific and ethical standards.
- Promotion of Open Data Practices: Encouraging more open access to AI datasets and modeling code will foster a collaborative environment that enhances the scrutiny, replication, and advancement of AI technologies, thereby solidifying their role in healthcare.

In summary, while AI offers significant opportunities for advancing imaging informatics, leveraging these opportunities to their fullest extent necessitates stringent validation, adherence to robust reporting frameworks, and an overarching commitment to addressing ethical considerations. These steps are pivotal in ensuring that AI-driven tools achieve their promise of enhancing efficiency and effectiveness in medical diagnostics.

== Areas of interest ==
Key areas relevant to Imaging informatics include:

- Picture archiving and communication system (PACS) and component systems
- Imaging informatics for the enterprise
- Image-enabled electronic medical records
- Radiology Information Systems (RIS) and Hospital Information Systems (HIS)
- Digital image acquisition
- Image processing and enhancement
- Radiomics
- Image data compression
- 3D visualization and multimedia
- Speech recognition
- Computer-aided diagnosis (CAD).
- Imaging facilities design
- Imaging vocabularies and ontologies
- Data mining from medical images databases
- Transforming the Radiological Interpretation Process (TRIP)
- DICOM, HL7, FHIR and other standards
- Workflow and process modeling and process simulation
- Quality assurance
- Archive integrity and security
- Teleradiology
- Radiology informatics education
- Digital imaging

== Applications ==
Imaging Informatics has quite a few applications within the medical field.

=== Radiology ===
Imaging Informatics is most prominent within the field of radiology. Using AI, radiologists can use Imaging Informatics to ease their job and save time whilst analyzing images. A study published in "Current Medical Imaging" discovered that in CT imaging assisted by AI, the reading time to detect lung nodules and pleural effusions was reduced by more than 44% for radiologists.

=== Cardiology ===
Imaging informatics within Cardiology aids in the molecular phenotyping of CV(Cardiovascular) diseases and unification of CV knowledge. This means that through data extraction, imaging, and machine learning analysis of these data and images allow researchers to categorize diseases based on the characteristics or features discovered. With this classification, researchers are then able to unify this CV information into one platform for continued analysis and information retrieval.

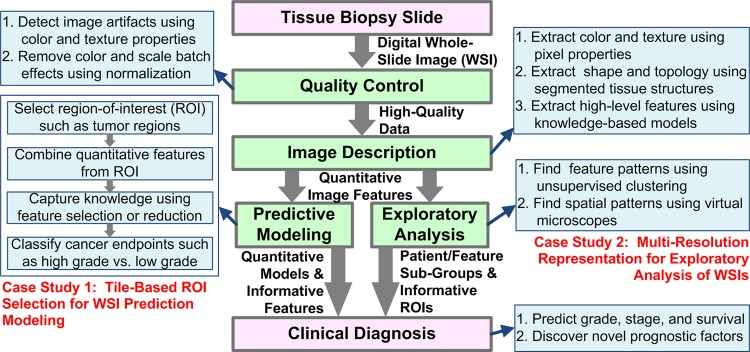
Clinical decision support system for quantitative analysis of whole-slide images.

=== Pathology ===
Imaging informatics in pathology as a whole allows for a wide range of disease detection and analysis. The most prominent use in pathology is with the detection and analysis of different forms of cancer. Diagnosing cancer manually is a pain staking and subjective process which includes examining what could be millions of cells. Through various clinical decision support systems(CDSS), professionals can ease the manual labor of tissue region selection, using Whole-Slide Imaging(WSI) tools to maximize the information analyzed. Several predictive models aimed to identify regions of interest within WSI, requiring training before use. Unsupervised models are being introduced, but are currently less prominent. An example of an unsupervised model being used is detecting tissue folds by using an unsupervised method to cluster the pixels in an image representing the difference between saturation and intensity values for every pixel. Due to being an unsupervised model, this method has some limitations. These limitations being that it has low sensitivity for different types of tissue folds within an image, and it has low specificity for images without tissue folds.

== Training ==
In the US and some other countries, radiologists who wish to pursue sub-specialty training in this field can undergo fellowship training in imaging informatics. Medical Imaging Informatics Fellowships are done after completion of Board Certification in Diagnostic Radiology, and may be pursued concurrently with other sub-specialty radiology fellowships.

The American Board of Imaging Informatics (ABII) also administers a certification examination for Imaging Informatics Professionals. PARCA (PACS Administrators Registry and Certification Association) certifications also exist for imaging informatics professionals.

The American Board of Preventive Medicine (ABPM) offers a certification examination for Clinical Informatics for physicians who have primary board certification with the American Board of Medical Specialties, a medical license and a medical degree. There are two pathways to be eligible to sit for the examination: Practice Pathway (open through 2022) for those who have not completed ACGME-accredited fellowship training in Clinical Informatics and ACGME-Accredited Fellowship Pathway of at least 24 months in duration.

== Recent innovations ==
=== Integration of DICOM standards (late 1990s to early 2000s) ===
The expansion of DICOM standards facilitated the widespread adoption of Picture Archiving and Communication Systems (PACS), marking a milestone in the digital transformation of imaging informatics. This standardization, which began to take hold in the late 1990s and was established by the early 2000s, has enhanced the ability to store, retrieve, and share medical images across different systems, improving the efficiency of medical imaging practices.

=== Structured and automated reporting (early 2010s) ===
The adoption of structured reporting aimed to standardize reports to be concise and uniform, influencing patient care. The introduction of BI-RADS (Breast Imaging–Reporting and Data System) is a notable example, which has led to improved consistency across mammography reports. This milestone spans several years as these systems were refined and more widely adopted throughout the early 2010s.

=== Advancements in AI and deep learning (2012) ===
The realization that graphics processing units (GPUs) could be used to accelerate neural networks occurred around 2012. This advancement led to the rapid development of deep learning techniques, speeding up tasks like image segmentation, feature recognition, and algorithm creation from large datasets of annotated images. This era of AI has enabled high-performance algorithms capable of assisting in hundreds of diagnostic tasks.

=== Rise of radiomics (late 2010s) ===
The field of radiomics, which involves extracting quantitative features from medical images that are invisible to the human eye, saw significant growth towards the late 2010s. This approach has enabled a deeper analysis of imaging data, which can be correlated with genomic patterns and other medical data to enhance diagnostic and predictive accuracy.

=== Photon-counting CT detectors (2022) ===
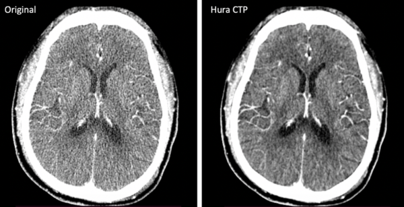
Original (left side) compared to reconstructed (right side) brain image produced from CT scans with low radiation dose. Reconstruction method improves image quality for accurate diagnosis.

The development and FDA clearance of photon-counting detectors (PCD) for computed tomography (CT) scans in 2022 was an important innovation. These detectors offer a more efficient process for converting X-rays to electrical signals, allowing for better material differentiation and potentially reducing the radiation dose for patients. The image to the right shows two scans of the same brain using old and new CT technology respectively.

== Current research and future directions ==
Current research in imaging informatics is primarily focused on the integration and advancement of artificial intelligence (AI) and machine learning (ML) within medical imaging technologies. Efforts are concentrated on enhancing diagnostic precision, improving predictive analytics, and automating image analysis processes. Deep learning, a subset of ML, is particularly pivotal in transforming radiological imaging, with algorithms increasingly being developed for tasks such as tumor detection, organ segmentation, and anomaly identification. These advancements not only aim to increase the efficiency and accuracy of diagnoses but also strive to reduce the workload on radiologists by automating routine tasks.

Looking ahead, the future directions of imaging informatics are expected to further embrace interdisciplinary approaches, incorporating genetics, pathology, and data from wearable devices to offer more holistic views of patient health. The concept of "radiogenomics," linking imaging features with genomic data, is an area of growing interest, potentially leading to more personalized and precise medical treatments. Additionally, the ongoing development of interoperability standards and secure data exchange protocols will be crucial in enabling the seamless integration of imaging data across different healthcare platforms, enhancing collaborative research and clinical practice globally.

== Challenges in imaging informatics ==
There are several challenges in the field of Imaging Informatics:

1. Data Management: The sheer volume of data generated from a large amount of high quality images poses storage and efficiency issues. Efficient management, storage, and retrieval of these images is critical. This is a challenge in terms of infrastructure and development of systems capable of handling and processing large datasets efficiently.
2. Integration: Healthcare is a very slow field to adapt change. This is because all systems must be thoroughly tested and must work in tandem with existing systems without any issues.
3. Security: Personal security and safe data management is always a concern. This concern is elevated in the field of healthcare since the standard and regulations for security are much higher. Medical imaging often involves sharing sensitive patient data across networks, robust security measures are essential to protect against data breaches and ensure privacy compliance. This includes secure transmission, encryption of data at rest, and rigorous access controls.
4. Integration of Artificial Intelligence: While AI offers significant potential to enhance diagnostic accuracy and efficiency in imaging, its integration into clinical workflows is fraught with challenges. These include the need for high-quality, annotated datasets for training AI models, the risk of algorithmic bias, and the black-box nature of some AI systems which can obscure how decisions are made. There is also skepticism among healthcare professionals regarding the reliability and accuracy of AI, which can hinder its adoption.
5. Ethical and Legal Issues: The deployment of advanced imaging technologies raises ethical questions about the extent to which AI should be involved in patient diagnosis and the potential for AI to replace human radiologists. Legal implications, particularly concerning malpractice and liability when AI is used, are yet unresolved. These issues necessitate clear guidelines and robust ethical frameworks to govern the use of AI in medical imaging.

Addressing these challenges requires a coordinated effort among technology developers, healthcare providers, regulatory bodies, and other stakeholders. Advances in technology must be balanced with considerations of practicality, ethics, and equity to ensure that imaging informatics can fulfill its promise to enhance patient care and treatment outcomes.

== Technological advances ==
=== Software innovations ===
Recent years have seen significant advancements in software technologies relevant to imaging informatics. One notable development is the integration of machine learning algorithms into imaging software, enabling automated analysis and interpretation of medical images. For instance, Rajpurkar et al. (2017) demonstrated the effectiveness of deep learning algorithms in pneumonia detection on chest X-rays, showcasing the potential of machine learning in medical imaging analysis. These algorithms have shown promising results in tasks such as lesion detection, disease classification, and treatment response assessment. Moreover, the implementation of natural language processing (NLP) techniques has facilitated the extraction of valuable insights from unstructured radiology reports, enhancing the efficiency of data analysis and decision-making processes.

=== Hardware developments ===
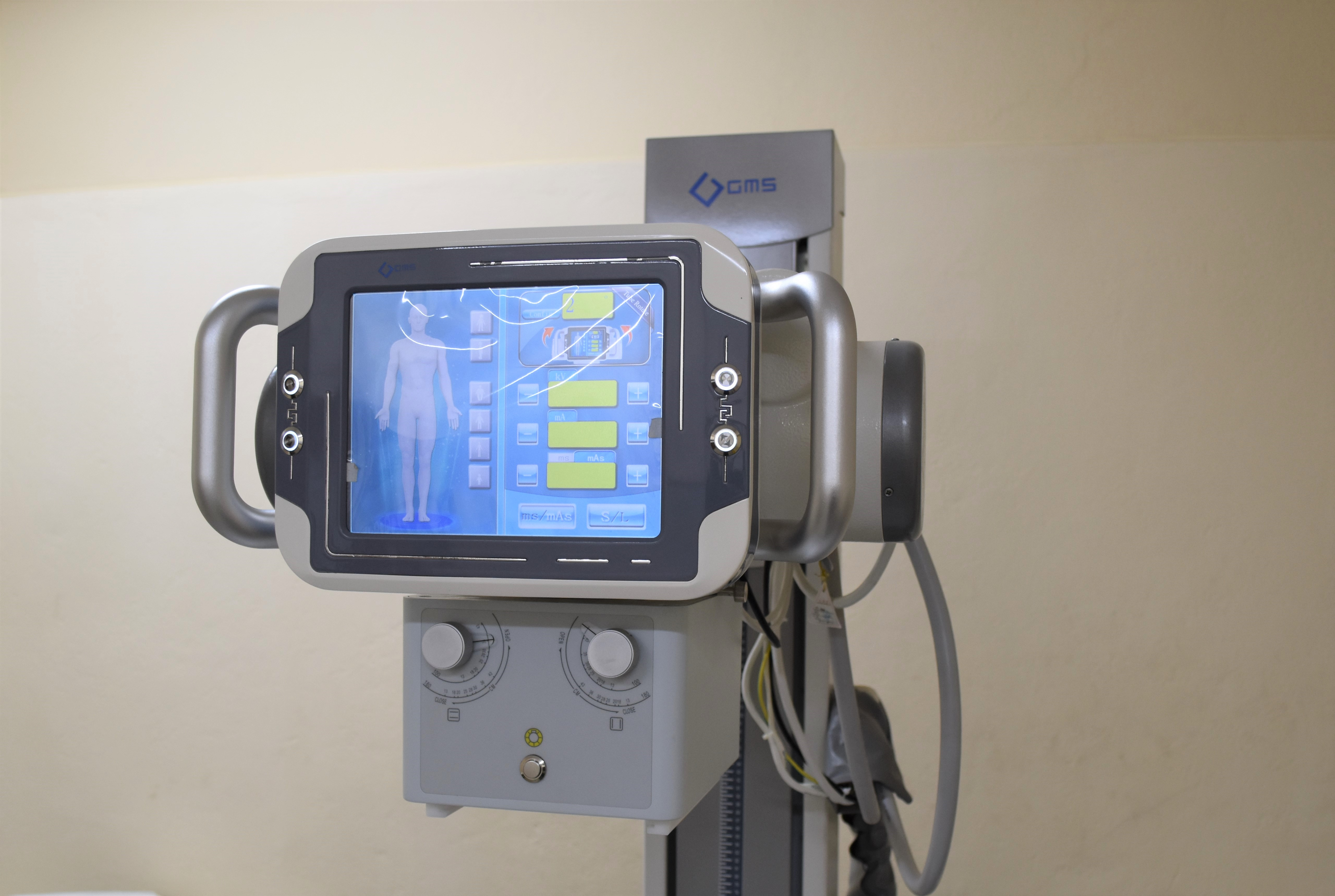
Point-of-care imaging gives patients real time diagnosis and a transparent health experience.

Advances in hardware technology have also played a pivotal role in shaping the landscape of imaging informatics. The evolution of imaging modalities, such as magnetic resonance imaging (MRI), computed tomography (CT), and positron emission tomography (PET), has led to improvements in image resolution, acquisition speed, and diagnostic accuracy. Additionally, the miniaturization of imaging devices has enabled point-of-care imaging, allowing for real-time assessment of patients in various clinical settings. For example, the development of handheld ultrasound devices has revolutionized point-of-care imaging by providing clinicians with portable and easy-to-use tools for bedside examinations (Smith, 2018). The rise of wearable devices and mobile health applications has further expanded the scope of imaging informatics, facilitating remote imaging and patient monitoring using sensors and cameras.

=== Methodological advancements ===
Along with technological innovations, methodological advancements have expanded the capabilities of imaging informatics. One development is the integration of multimodal imaging techniques, which combine data from multiple imaging modalities to provide complementary information about anatomical and physiological structures. For instance, recent studies have demonstrated the effectiveness of combining MRI, CT, and ultrasound data for improved diagnosis and treatment planning in oncology patients (Gupta et al., 2020). By fusing data from these sources, clinicians can obtain a more comprehensive understanding of a patient's condition, leading to more accurate diagnoses and personalized treatment plans.
