= Agence nationale de sécurité du médicament et des produits de santé =

ANSM
- National Agency for the Safety of Medicines and Health Products
- Agence nationale de sécurité du médicament et des produits de santé

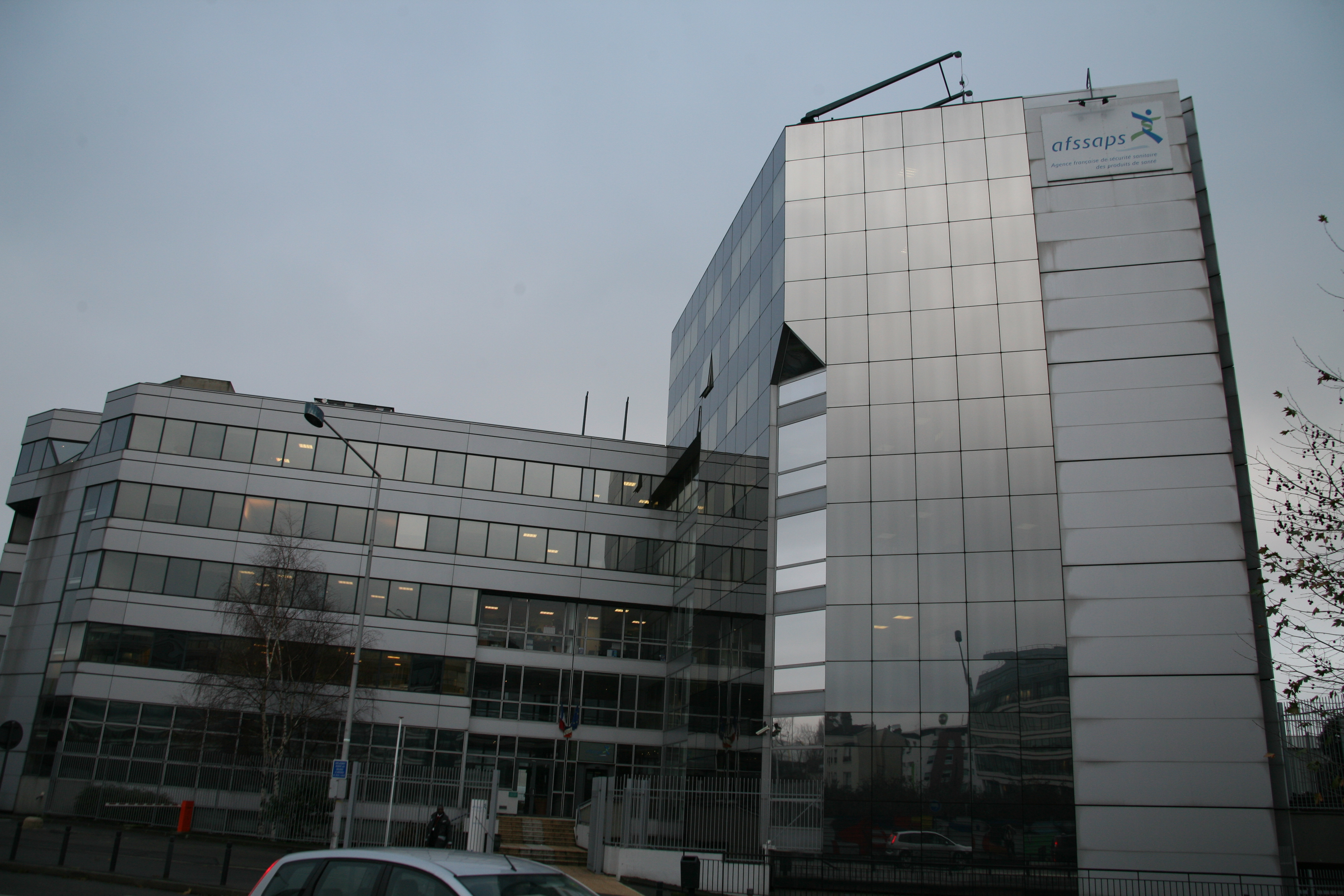
- Building of the ANSM.
- Formation: May 1, 2012; 14 years ago
- Headquarters: 143 Boulevard Anatole France, 93200 Saint-Denis, Seine-Saint-Denis
- Location: Saint-Denis, Seine-Saint-Denis, France
- Director: Catherine Paugam-Burtz
- Parent organization: Ministry of Health and Access to Care (France)
- Budget: €142.6 million
- Website: https://ansm.sante.fr/
- Formerly called: Medicines Agency; French Health Products Safety Agency

Agence nationale de sécurité du médicament et des produits de santé (ANSM) is a drug regulator in France. ANSM is responsible for assessing the benefits and risks associated with the use of drugs and other medical products throughout their life-cycle: it assesses the safety, efficacy and quality of these products and must balance patient safety with access to novel therapies.

== Agence française de sécurité sanitaire des produits de santé (AFSSAPS) ==
Logo of the Agence française de sécurité sanitaire des produits de santé

ANSM superseded the tasks and duties of Agence française de sécurité sanitaire des produits de santé (French Agency for the Safety of Health Products) on 1 May 2012. AFSSAPS (or AFSSaPS) was a French government agency whose main mission was to assess health risks posed by health products intended for human consumption, particularly pharmaceutical drugs. It was responsible for issuing permits for marketing approval, and became the single French authority in the regulation of biomedical research. AFSSAPS was last headed by Dominique Maraninchi and had about 1,000 employees plus 2,000 associated experts. Its budget amounted to approximately 157 million euros, with the bulk of revenue came from taxes and charges levied on the activity of the pharmaceutical industry.

== History ==
The Medicines Agency was created by law no. 93-5 of January 4, 1993 and decree no. 93-265 of March 8, 1993, notably following the contaminated blood affair. It became operational in April 1993, then the structure and organization of the agency were approved by the French government on September 2, 1993.

== Health data, publications ==
A list of 77 monitored drugs was published in 2011.

In mid-December 2014, Health Insurance posted on www.data.gouv.fr 112 sets of open data, certified health data relating to the supply and consumption of healthcare in France, in order to improve transparency. drug prescription, traceability of active ingredients and their date of marketing.

In September 2018, the ANSM prevented the transmission of information on Levothyrox to an association of victims, on the grounds of business secrecy.
